This is list of notable banks, sorted alphabetically.

A

 Aareal Bank, Wiesbaden, Germany
 Aargauische Kantonalbank, Aarau, Switzerland
 Abacus Federal Savings Bank, New York, United States
 AB Bank, Dhaka, Bangladesh
 AB SEB bankas, Vilnius, Lithuania
 ABC Islamic Bank, Manama, Bahrain
 ABC Bank (Kenya), Nairobi, Kenya
 ABC Bank (Uganda), Kampala, Uganda
 Abhyudaya Co-operative Bank Ltd, Mumbai, India
 ABLV Bank, AS, Riga, Latvia
 ABN AMRO, Amsterdam, Netherlands
 ABN AMRO Group, Amsterdam, Netherlands
 Absa Group Limited, Johannesburg, South Africa
 Abu Dhabi Commercial Bank, Abu Dhabi, United Arab Emirates
 Abu Dhabi Islamic Bank, Abu Dhabi, United Arab Emirates
 ACBA-Credit Agricole Bank, Yerevan, Armenia
 Access Bank Azerbaijan, Baku, Azerbaijan
 Access Bank Group, Lagos, Nigeria
 AccessBank Liberia, Monrovia, Liberia
 Access Bank plc, Lagos, Nigeria
 Access Bank Rwanda, Kigali, Rwanda
 AccessBank Azerbaijan, Baku, Azerbaijan
 AccessBank Tajikistan, Dushanbe, Tajikistan
 Access Bank Zambia,   Lusaka, Zambia
 Achmea Bank, The Hague, Netherlands
 Achmea Hypotheekbank, Den Bosch, Netherlands
 Acleda Bank, Phnom Penh, Cambodia
 Acleda Bank Myanmar, Yangon, Myanmar
 Adabank, Istanbul, Turkey
 Addiko Bank, Klagenfurt, Austria
 AEK Bank 1826, Thun, Switzerland
 Affin Bank, Kuala Lumpur, Malaysia
 Afghanistan International Bank, Kabul, Afghanistan
 AfrAsia Bank Limited, Port Louis, Mauritius
 Afrasia Bank Zimbabwe Limited, Harare, Zimbabwe
 African Bank, Midrand, South Africa
 African Export–Import Bank (Afreximbank), Cairo, Egypt
 African Investment Bank, Tripoli, Libya
 Afriland First Bank, Yaoundé, Cameroon
 Agrani Bank, Dhaka, Bangladesh
 Agricultural Bank of Libya, Tripoli, Libya
 Agricultural Bank of China, Beijing, China
 Agricultural Cooperative Bank of Iraq, Baghdad, Iraq
 Agricultural Development Bank of Ghana, Accra, Ghana
 Agriculture Development Bank, Ramshah Path, Kathmandu
 Agrobank, Kuala Lumpur, Malaysia
 Agroindustrijsko Komercijalna Banka, Nis, Serbia
 Agroinvestbank, Dushanbe, Tajikistan
 Ahli Bank Qatar, Doha, Qatar
 Ahli United Bank, Manama, Bahrain
 Ahli United Bank Kuwait, Safat, Kuwait
 Aichi Bank, Nagoya, Japan
 AIK Banka, Belgrade, Serbia
 Ak Bars Holding, Kazan, Russia
 Akbank, Istanbul, Turkey
 Akiba Commercial Bank, Dar es Salaam, Tanzania
 Akita Bank, Akita, Japan
 Aktia Bank, Helsinki, Finland
 Al Ahli Bank of Kuwait, Safat, Kuwait
 Al-Amanah Islamic Investment Bank of the Philippines, Zamboanga City, Philippines
 Al-Arafah Islami Bank Limited, Dhaka, Bangladesh
 Alawwal Bank, Riyadh, Saudi 
 Albaraka Türk, Istanbul, Turkey
 Al Baraka Banking Group, Manama, Bahrain
 Albaraka Türk, Istanbul, Turkey
 Al Bilad Bank, Riyadh, Saudi Arabia
 Al Hilal Bank, Abu Dhabi, United Arab Emirates
 Al Rajhi Bank, Riyadh, Saudi Arabia
 Al Rajhi Bank Malaysia, Kuala Lumpur, Malaysia
 Al Shamal Islamic Bank, Khartoum, Sudan
 Al Watany Bank of Egypt (AWB), Giza, Egypt
 Alfa-Bank, Moscow, Russia
 Alfa-Bank, Kyiv, Ukraine
 Alinma Bank, Riyadh, Saudi 
 Alior Bank, Warsaw, Poland
 Allahabad Bank, Calcutta, India
 Allbank Panama, Panama City, Panama
 Allgemeine Sparkasse Oberosterreich, Linz, Austria
 Alliance Bank JSC, Almaty, Kazakhstan
 Alliance Bank Malaysia Berhad, Kuala Lumpur, Malaysia
 Allianz, Munich, Germany
 Allied Bank Limited, Lahore, Pakistan
 Allied Banking Corporation, Makati, Philippines
 Allied Bank Zimbabwe Limited, Harare, Zimbabwe
 Allied Irish Banks (AIB), Dublin, Ireland
 Alterna Bank, Ontario, Canada
 Alternatif Bank, Istanbul, Turkey
 Ally Financial, Detroit, United States
 Aloqabank, Tashkent, Uzbekistan
 AlpenBank, Innsbruck, Austria
 Alpha Bank, Athens, Greece
 Alpha Bank Albania, Tirana, Albania
 Alpha Bank Cyprus, Nicosia, Cyprus
 Alpha Bank Romania, Bucharest, Romania
 Alpha Bank Skopje, Skopje, Macedonia
 Alpha Bank UK, London, United Kingdom
 Alternatif Bank, Istanbul, Turkey
 Amagasaki Shinkin Bank, Amagasaki, Japan
 AmalBank, Accra, Ghana
 Amalgamated Bank, New York, United States
 Amalgamated Bank of Chicago, Chicago, United States
 Amana Bank, Dar es Salaam, Tanzania
 Amana Bank (Sri Lanka), Sri Lanka
 AM Bank, Beirut, Lebanon
 AmBank Group, Kuala Lumpur, Malaysia
 Amen Bank, Tunis, Tunisia
 Ameriabank, Yerevan, Armenia
 American Continental Bank, Los Angeles, United States
 American National Corporation, Omaha, United States
 American Premier Bank, Arcadia, United States
 Ameris Bancorp, Jacksonville, United States
 Amin Investment Bank, Tehran, Iran 
 AMP Limited, Sydney, Australia
 Amsterdam Trade Bank, Amsterdam, Netherlands
 Anadolubank, Istanbul, Turkey
 Andbank, Andorra La Vella, Andorra 
 Andbank Panama, Panama City, Panama
 Andhra Bank, Hyderabad, India
 Ansar-VDP Unnayan Bank, Dhaka, Bangladesh
 Antwerp Diamond Bank, Antwerp, Belgium
 ANZ Amerika Samoa Bank, Pago Pago, American Samoa
 ANZ Bank New Zealand, Auckland, New Zealand
 ANZ Royal Bank, Phom Penh, Cambodia
 Australia and New Zealand Banking Group, Melbourne, Australia
 Aomori Bank, Aomori, Japan
 Aozora Bank, Tokyo, Japan
 Appenzeller Kantonalbank, Appenzell, Switzerland
 Apple Bank for Savings, New York, United States
 APS Bank, Birkirkara, Malta 
 Arab Bangladesh Bank, Dhaka, Bangladesh
 Arab Bank, Amman, Jordan
 Arab Banking Corporation, Manama, Bahrain
 Arab Banking Corporation Algeria, Algiers, Algeria
 Arab Banking Corporation Brasil, São Paulo, Brazil
 Arab Banking Corporation Egypt, Cairo, Egypt
 Arab Banking Corporation Jordan, Amman, Jordan
 Arab Banking Corporation Tunisia, Tunis, Tunisia
 Arab Israel Bank, Nesher, Israel
 Arab National Bank (ANB), Riyadh, Saudi Arabia
 Arab Tunisian Bank (ATB), Tunis, Tunisia
 Arbejdernes Landsbank, Copenhagen, Denmark
 Arbuthnot Latham, London, United Kingdom
 ArdShinInvestBank, Yerevan, Armenia
 Argenta Group, Antwerp, Belgium
 Argenta (bank), Antwerp, Belgium
 Arion Bank, Reykjavik, Iceland
 Arkada Bank, Kyiv, Ukraine
 ArmSwissBank, Yerevan, Armenia
 Artsakhbank, Yerevan, Armenia
 Arvest Bank, Bentonville, United States
 AS SEB Pank, Tallinn, Estonia
 Asahi Shinkin Bank, Tokyo, Japan
 ASB Bank, Auckland, New Zealand
 Asia Commercial Bank (ACB), Ho Chi Minh City, Vietnam
 Asia Green Development Bank, Yangon, Myanmar
 Asia United Bank, Pasig, Philippines
 Askari Bank, Rawalpindi, Pakistan
 ASN Bank, The Hague, Netherlands
 Astoria Bank, Lake Success, United States
 AtaBank, Baku, Azerbaijan
 Atlantic Bank Group, Lome, Togo
 Atlas Mara Bank Zambia Limited, Lusaka, Zambia
 Attica Bank, Athens, Greece
 Attijariwafa Bank, Casablanca, Morocco
 Auburn National Bancorporation, Auburn, United States
 Aurskog Sparebank, Aurskog, Norway
 AU Small Finance Bank, Rajasthan, India 
 Auswide Bank, Bundaberg, Australia
 Awash International Bank, Addis Ababa, Ethiopia
 Axa Bank Belgium, Brussels, Belgium
 Axis Bank, Mumbai, India
 Ayandeh Bank, Tehran, Iran
 Ayeyarwady Bank, Yangon, Myanmar
 Azania Bank, Dar es Salaam, Tanzania
 Azer-Turk Bank, Baku, Azerbaijan
 Azerigasbank, Baku, Azerbaijan
 Azizi Bank, Kabul, Afghanistan

B

 B2B Bank, Toronto, Canada
 B&N Bank, Moscow, Russia
 Baader Bank AG, Unterschleißheim, Germany
 Babylon Bank, Baghdad, Iraq
 BAC Credomatic, Managua, Nicaragua
 Bahrain Development Bank, Manama, Bahrain
 Bahrain Islamic Bank (BISB), Manama, Bahrain
 Baiduri Bank, Bandar Seri Begawan, Brunei
 Balboa Bank and Trust, Ciudad de Panamá, Republic of Panama
 BanBajío, Leon, Mexico
 Banc of California, Irvine, United States
 Banca Apulia, San Severo (Foggia), Italy
 BancABC, Gaborone, Botswana
 Banca Carige, Genoa, Italy
 Banca Cassa di Risparmio di Firenze, Florence, Italy
 Banca Cassa di Risparmio di Savigliano, Savigliano, Italy
 Banca Comercială Română, Bucharest, Romania
 Banca delle Marche, Ancona, Italy
 Banca dello Stato del Cantone Ticino, Bellinzona, Switzerland
 Banca dell'Umbria, Perugia, Italy
 Banca del Mezzogiorno – MedioCredito Centrale, Rome, Italy
 Banca del Monte di Lucca, Lucca, Italy
 Banca di Cambiano, Castelfiorentino, Italy
 Banca di Credito Cooperativo di Alba Langhe e Roero, Alba, Italy
 Banca di Credito Popolare, Torre Del Greco, Italy
 Banca di Credito Sardo, Cagliari, Italy
 Banca di Sassari, Sassari, Italy
 Banca Etruria, Arezzo, Italy
 Banca Finnat, Rome, Italy
 Banca Generali, Trieste, Italy
 Banca IFIS, Venice, Italy
 Banca IMI, Milan, Italy
 Banca Intermobiliare, Turin, Italy
 Banca Intesa Beograd, Belgrade, Serbia
 Banca Intesa Russia, Moscow, Russia
 Banca Intesa Serbia, Belgrade, Serbia
 Banca Italease, Milano, Italy
 Banca March, Palma de Mallorca, Spain
 Banca Mediocredito del Friuli Venezia Giulia, Udine, Italy
 Banca Mediolanum, Milano, Italy
 Banca Monte dei Paschi di Siena, Siena, Italy
 Banca Monte Parma, Parma, Italy
 Banca Monte Paschi Belgio, Brussels, Belgium
 Banca Nazionale del Lavoro, Roma, Italy
 Banca Padovana Credito Cooperativo, Campodarsego (Pd), Italy
 Banca Popolare dell'Emilia Romagna, Modena, Italy
 Banca Popolare di Bari, Bari, Italy
 Banca Popolare di Crema, Crema, Italy
 Banca Popolare di Milano, Milano, Italy
 Banca Popolare di Novara, Novara, Italy
 Banca Popolare di Sondrio, Sondrio, Italy
 Banca Popolare di Sondrio Switzerland, Lugano, Switzerland
 Banca Popolare di Spoleto, Spoleto, Italy
 Banca Popolare di Vicenza, Vicenza, Italy
 Banca Popolare FriulAdria, Pordenone, Italy
 Banca Privada d'Andorra, Escaldes-Engordany, Andorra
 Banca Prossima, Milano, Italy
 Banca Pueyo, Badajoz, Spain
 Banca Regionale Europea, Milano, Italy
 Bancaribe, Caracas, Venezuela
 Banca Romaneasca, Bucharest, Romania
 Banca Sella, Biella, Italy
 Banca Transilvania, Cluj-Napoca, Romania
 Banco Alfa, São Paulo, Brazil
 Banco Amambay, Asunción, Paraguay
 Banco Angolano de Investimentos, Luanda, Angola
 Banco AV Villas, Bogotá D.C., Colombia
 Banco Azteca, Iztapalapa, Mexico
 Banco BICE, Santiago, Chile
 Banco Bicentenario, Caracas, Venezuela
 Banco Bilbao Vizcaya Argentaria, Bilbao, Spain
 Banco BPM, Milan, Italy
 Banco BISA, La Paz, Bolivia
 Banco BMG, São Paulo, Brazil
 Banco Bradesco, São Paulo, Brazil
 Banco Caboverdiano de Negócios, Praia, Cape Verde
 Banco Caixa Geral, Vigo, Spain
 Banco Comercial do Atlântico, Santiago, Cape Verde
 Banco Continental, San Pedro Sula, Honduras
 Banco Credicoop, Buenos Aires, Argentina
 Banco Crédito y Ahorro Ponceño, Ponce, Puerto Rico
 Banco de Bogota, Bogotá D.C., Colombia
 Banco de Brasilia, Brasilia, Brazil
 Banco de Chile, Santiago, Chile
 Banco de Comércio e Indústria, Angola
 Banco de Costa Rica, San José, Costa Rica
 Banco de Crédito de Bolivia, La Paz, Bolivia
 Banco de Crédito del Perú, Lima, Peru
 Banco de Crédito e Inversiones (BCI), Santiago, Chile
 Banco de Desenvolvimento de Angola, Angola
 Banco de la Nacion, San Isidro, Peru
 Banco de la Nacion Argentina, Buenos Aires, Argentina
 Banco de la Produccion, Managua, Nicaragua
 Banco de la Republica, Montevideo, Uruguay
 Banco de la Republica Oriental del Uruguay, Buenos Aires, Argentina
 Banco de Machala, Machala, Ecuador
 Banco de Occidente, Cali, Colombia
 Banco de Ponce, Ponce, Puerto Rico
 Banco de Portugal, Lisbon, Portugal
 Banco de Poupança e Crédito, Luanda, Angola
 Banco de Sabadell, Sabadell, Spain
 Banco de Valencia, Valencia, Spain
 Banco de Venezuela, Caracas, Venezuela
 Banco del Estado de Chile, Santiago, Chile
 Banco del Pacifico, Guayaquil, Ecuador
 Banco del Sur, Puerto Ordaz, Venezuela
 Banco Delta Asia, Macau, Macao
 Banco di Desio e della Brianza, Desio, Italy
 Banco di Napoli, Naples, Italy
 Banco di Sardegna, Sassari, Italy
 Banco do Nordeste, Fortaleza, Brazil
 Banco do Brasil, Brasilia, Brazil
 Banco Económico (Angola), Luanda, Angola
 Banco Español de Crédito, Madrid, Spain
 Banco Espírito Santo, Lisbon, Portugal
 Banco Espírito Santo Angola, Largo das Ingombotas, Angola
 Banco Falabella, Santiago, Chile
 Banco Gallego, La Coruña, Spain
 Banco Hipotecario, Buenos Aires, Argentina
 Banco Hipotecario del Uruguay (BHU), Montevideo, Uruguay
 Banco Industrial de Venezuela, Caracas, Venezuela
 Banco Interatlântico, Santiago, Cape Verde
 Banco Internacional de Costa Rica, San José, Costa Rica
 Banco Internacional de São Tomé e Príncipe, Sao Tome, Central Africa
 Banco Internacional del Peru, Lima, Peru
 Banco Internacional do Funchal, Lisbon, Portugal
 Banco Invest, Lisbon, Portugal
 Banco Itau Argentina, Buenos Aires, Argentina
 Banco Itau Chile, Santiago, Chile
 Banco Itau Paraguay, Asunción, Paraguay
 Banco Latinoamericano de Comercio Exterior, Panama City, Panama
 Banco Macro, Buenos Aires, Argentina
 Banco Mercantil, Caracas, Venezuela
 Banco Mercantil Santa Cruz, La Paz, Bolivia
 Bancomext, Mexico City, Mexico
 Banco Nacional de Bolivia, La Paz, Bolivia
 Banco Nacional de Costa Rica, San José, Costa Rica
 Banco Nacional de Crédito, Caracas, Venezuela
 Banco Nacional de Investimento, Maputo, Mozambique
 Banco Nacional de Panama, Panama City, Panama
 Banco Nacional Ultramarino, Lisbon, Portugal
 Banco Occidental de Descuento, Maracaibo, Venezuela
 Banco Palmas, Ceara, Brazil
 Banco Pan, São Paulo, Brazil
 Banco Paris, Santiago, Chile
 Banco Pastor, La Coruña, Spain
 Banco Patagonia, Buenos Aires, Argentina
 Banco Penta, Santiago, Chile
 Banco Pichincha, Pichincha, Ecuador
 Banco Popolare, Verona, Italy
 Banco Popular, San Pedro Sula, Honduras
 Banco Popular, Bogotá D.C., Colombia
 Banco Popular, Madrid, Spain
 Banco Português de Investimento  (BPI), Porto, Portugal
 Banco Regional, Encarnacion, Paraguay
 Banco Ripley, Santiago, Chile
 Banco Sabadell, Alicante, Spain
 Banco Safra, São Paulo, Brazil
 Banco Santander, Madrid, Spain
 Banco Santander (México) S.A., Mexico City, Mexico
 Banco Santander Brasil, São Paulo, Brazil
 Banco Santander Chile, Santiago, Chile
 Banco Santander Portugal, Lisbon, Portugal
 Banco Santander Rio, Buenos Aires, Argentina
 Banco Santander Totta, Lisbon, Portugal
 Banco Venezolano de Crédito, Caracas, Venezuela
 Banco Votorantim, São Paulo, Brazil
 Bancolombia, Medellin, Colombia
 BancorpSouth, Tupelo, United States
 Bancpost, Bucharest, Romania
 Bancrecer, Caracas, Venezuela
 Bandhan Bank, Kolkata, India
 Banesco, Caracas, Venezuela
 Banestes, Vitoria, Brazil
 Bangkok Bank, Bangkok, Thailand
 Bangladesh Bank, Dhaka, Bangladesh
 Bangladesh Commerce Bank Limited, Dhaka, Bangladesh
 Bangladesh Development Bank, Dhaka, Bangladesh
 Bangladesh Krishi Bank, Dhaka, Bangladesh
 Bangladesh Samabaya Bank Limited, Dhaka, Bangladesh
 Banisi, Panama City, Panama
 Banistmo, Panama City, Panama
 Banka Kombëtare Tregtare, Tirana, Albania
 Bank AL Habib, Multan, Pakistan
 Bank Alfalah, Karachi, Pakistan
 Bank Al-Maghrib, Rabat, Morocco
 Bank Asia Limited, Dhaka, Bangladesh
 Bank Asya, Istanbul, Turkey
 Bank Audi, Beirut, Lebanon
 Bank Australia, Victoria, Australia
 Bank Austria, Vienna, Austria
 Bank BPH, Gdansk, Poland
 Bank Central Asia (BCA), Jakarta, Indonesia
 Bank Day, Tehran, Iran
 Bank Eskhata, Khujand, Tajikistan
 Bank-e-Millie Afghan, Kabul, Afghanistan
 Bank First, Victoria, Australia
 Bank for Investment and Development of Vietnam (BIDV), Ho Chi Minh City, Vietnam
 Bank Forum, Kyiv, Ukraine
 Bank für Sozialwirtschaft, Cologne and Berlin, Germany
 Bank für Tirol und Vorarlberg, Innsbruck, Austria
 Bank Gaborone, Gaborone, Botswana
 Bank Gospodarstwa Krajowego, Warsaw, Poland
 Bank Gutmann, Vienna, Austria
 Bank Handlowy w Warszawie, Warsaw, Poland
 Bank Hapoalim, Tel Aviv, Israel
 Bankhaus Löbbecke, Berlin, Germany
 Bankhaus Spängler, Salzburg, Austria
 Bank im Bistum Essen, Essen, Germany
 Banking Company of West Africa, Dakar, Senegal
 Bank Insinger de Beaufort, Amsterdam, Netherlands
 Bank Internasional Indonesia, Jakarta, Indonesia
 Bank Islam Brunei Darussalam, Bandar Seri Begawan, Brunei
 BankIslami Pakistan, Karachi, Pakistan
 Bank Keshavarzi (Agri Bank), Tehran, Iran
 Bank Leumi, Tel Aviv, Israel
 Bank M, Dar es Salaam, Tanzania
 Bank Mandiri, Jakarta, Indonesia
 Bank Maskan, Tehran, Iran
 Bank Massad, Tel Aviv, Israel
 Bank Mellat, Tehran, Iran
 Bank Melli Iran, Tehran, Iran
 Bank Mendes Gans, Amsterdam, Netherlands
 Bank Millennium, Warsaw, Poland
 Bank Mizrahi-Tefahot, Ramat Gan, Israel
 Bank Muamalat Indonesia, Jakarta, Indonesia
 Bank Muamalat Malaysia, Kuala Lumpur, Malaysia
 Bank Muscat, Muscat, Oman
 Bank Nederlandse Gemeenten, The Hague, Netherlands
 Bank Negara Indonesia, Jakarta, Indonesia
 Bank Norwegian, Fornebu, Norway
 Bank OCBC NISP, Jakarta, Indonesia
 Bank Ochrony Srodowiska, Warsaw, Poland
 Bank of Africa Group, Bamako, Mali
 Bank of Africa Kenya Limited, Nairobi, Kenya
 Bank of Africa Uganda Limited, Kampala, Uganda
 Bank of Africa (Red Sea), Djibouti (City), Djibouti
 Bank of Aland, Mariehamn, Finland
 Bank of Albania, Tirana, Albania
 Bank of Algeria, Algiers, Algeria
 Bank of America, Charlotte, United States
 Bank of Ayudhya, Bangkok, Thailand
 Bank of Azad Jammu & Kashmir, Muzaffarabad, Azad Kashmir
 Bank of Baghdad, Baghdad, Iraq
 Bank of Bahrain and Kuwait (BBK), Manama, Bahrain
 Bank of Baroda, Mumbai, India
 Bank of Baroda Uganda Limited, Kampala, Uganda
 Bank of Beijing, Beijing, China
 Bank of Beirut, Beirut, Lebanon
 Bank of Baroda, Gujarat, India
 Bank of Botswana, Gaborone, Botswana
 Bank of Cape Verde, Praia, Cap Verde
 Bank of Central African States, Yaoundé, Cameroon
 Bank of Ceylon, Colombo, Sri Lanka
 Bank of China, Beijing, China
 Bank of China Hong Kong, Hong Kong, Hong Kong
 Bank of China (Canada), Ontario, Canada
 Bank of Commerce, Makati City, Philippines
 Bank of Communications, Shanghai, China
 Bank of Cyprus, Nicosia, Cyprus
 Bank of Dalian, Dalian, China
 Bank of Finland, Helsinki, Finland
 Bank of France, Paris, France
 Bank of Georgia, Tbilisi, Georgia
 Bank of Ghana, Accra, Ghana
 Bank of Greenland, Aabenraa, Denmark
 Bank of Hawaii Corporation, Honolulu, United States
 Bank of India, Mumbai, India
 Bank of Industry and Mine, Tehran, Iran
 Bank of Italy, Rome, Italy
 Bank of Ireland, Dublin, Ireland
 Bank of Iwate, Morioka, Japan
 Bank of Jerusalem, Jerusalem, Israel
 Bank of Jilin, Changchun, China
 Bank of Jordan, Amman, Jordan
 Bank of Kaohsiung, Kaohsiung, Taiwan
 Bank of Khartoum, Khartoum, Sudan
 Bank of Kigali, Kigali, Rwanda
 Bank of Korea, Jung District, Seoul
 Bank of Kyoto, Kyoto, Japan
 Bank of Latvia, Riga, Latvia
 Bank of Lithuania, Vilnius, Lithuania 
 Bank of London and The Middle East, London, United Kingdom
 Bank of Maharashtra, Pune, India
 Bank of Maldives, Male, Maldives
 Bank of Melbourne (1989), Melbourne, Australia
 Bank of Melbourne (2011), Melbourne, Australia
 Bank of Mexico, Mexico City, Mexico
 Bank of Mongolia, Ulaanbaatar, Mongolia
 Bank of Montreal, Montreal, Canada
 Bank of Montserrat, Brades, Montserrat
 Bank of Moscow, Moscow, Russia
 Bank of Mozambique, Maputo, Mozambique
 Bank of Namibia, Namibia 
 Bank of New York Mellon, New York, United States
 Bank of New Zealand, Auckland, New Zealand
 Bank of Ningbo, Ningbo, China
 Bank of Papua New Guinea, Port Moresby, Papua New Guinea
 Bank of Punjab, Lahore, Pakistan
 Bank of Qingdao, Qingdao, China
 Bank of Queensland, Brisbane, Australia
 Bank of Shanghai, Shanghai, China
 Bank of Sierra Leone, Freetown, Sierra Leone
 Bank of Slovenia, Ljubljana, Slovenia
 Bank of South Pacific, Port Moresby, Papua New Guinea
 Bank of South Sudan, Juba, South Sudan
 Bank of Spain, Madrid, Spain
 Bank of St Lucia, Castries, St Lucia
 Bank of Syria and Overseas, Damascus, Syria
 Bank of Taiwan, Taipei, Taiwan
 Bank of Taizhou, Taizhou, China
 Bank of Tanzania, Dar es Salaam, Tanzania
 Bank of the City of Buenos Aires, Buenos Aires, Argentina
 Bank of the Nation (Peru), Lima, Peru
 Bank of the Orient, California, United States
 Bank of the Ozarks, Little Rock, United States
 Bank of the Philippine Islands, Makati City, Philippines
 Bank of the Province of Buenos Aires, Buenos Aires, Argentina
 Bank of the Republic of Haiti, Port-au-Prince, Haiti
 Bank of the Ryukyus, Naha, Japan
 Bank of the West, San Francisco, California
 Bank of Tianjin, Tianjin, China
 Bank of Tokyo Mitsubishi, Tokyo, Japan
 Bank of Uganda, Kampala, Uganda
 Bank of Valletta, Valletta, Malta
 Bank of Western Australia, Perth, Australia
 Bank of Yokohama, Yokohama, Japan
 Bank of Zambia, Lusaka, Zambia
 Bank One Mauritius, Port Louis, Mauritius
 Bank Otsar Ha-Hayal, Israel 
 Bank Pasargad, Tehran, Iran
 Bank Pekao, Warsaw, Poland
 Bank Permata, Jakarta, Indonesia
 Bank Pocztowy, Bydgoszcz, Poland
 Bank Polska Kasa Opieki, Warsaw, Poland
 Bank Pundi Indonesia, Jakarta, Indonesia
 Bank Rakyat Indonesia, Jakarta, Indonesia
 Bank Refah, Tehran, Iran
 Bank Respublika, Baku, Azerbaijan
 Bank Rossiya, St Petersburg, Russia
 Bank Saderat Iran (BSI), Tehran, Iran
 Bank Saint Petersburg, St Petersburg, Russia
 Bank Sepah, Tehran, Iran
 Bank Simpanan Nasional, Kuala Lumpur, Malaysia
 Bank SinoPac, Taipei, Taiwan
 Bank South Pacific, Port Moresby, Papua New Guinea
 Bank Sparhafen Zürich, Zürich, Switzerland
 Bank Spółdzielczy w Brodnicy, Brodnica, Poland
 Bank Stern, Paris, France
 Bank Tabungan Negara (BTN), Jakarta, Indonesia
 Bank Tejarat, Tehran, Iran
 Bank Ten Cate & Cie, Amsterdam, Netherlands
 BankVic, Melbourne, Australia
 Bankwest, Perth, Western Australia
 Bank Windhoek, Windhoek, Namibia
 Bank Zachodni WBK, Wroclaw, Poland
 Banka Kombetare Tregtare, Tirana, Albania
 BankAtlantic Bancorp, Fort Lauderdale, United States
 Bankhaus Bauer, Stuttgart, Germany
 Bankhaus Lampe, Bielefeld, Germany
 Bankhaus Reuschel & Co., Munich, Germany
 Bankia, Madrid, Spain
 Bankinter, Madrid, Spain
 Bankmecu, Kew, Australia
 BankMuscat (SAOG), Muscat, Oman
 BankNordik, Tórshavn, Faroe Islands
 Bankoa, San Sebastian, Spain
 BankSA, Adelaide, South Australia
 BankUnited, Miami Lakes, United States
 Banque Bemo Saudi Fransi, Damascus, Syria
 Banque Cantonale de Fribourg, Fribourg, Switzerland
 Banque Cantonale de Geneve, Geneva, Switzerland
 Banque Cantonale du Valais, Sion, Switzerland
 Banque Cantonale Neuchateloise, Neuchâtel, Switzerland
 Banque Cantonale Vaudoise, Lausanne, Switzerland
 Banque Commerciale du Congo, Kinshasa, DRC Congo
 Banque du Développement du Mali, Bamako, Mali
 Banque de Luxembourg, Luxembourg, Luxembourg
 Banque de l'Habitat, Tunis, Tunisia
 Banque de l'Habitat du Mali, Bamako, Mali
 Banque du Liban, Beirut, Lebanon
 Banque de l'Union Haitienne, Port-au-Prince, Haiti
 Banque de Tunisie, Tunis, Tunisia
 Banque de Tunisie et des Emirats, Tunis, Tunisia
 Banque du Caire, Cairo, Egypt
 Banque et Caisse d'Épargne de l'État, Luxembourg City, Luxembourg
 Banque Francaise Commerciale Ocean Indien, Paris, France
 Banque Internationale a Luxembourg, Luxembourg, Luxembourg
 Banque Internationale Arabe de Tunisie, Tunis, Tunisia
 Banque Internationale du Benin (BIBE), Cotonou, Benin
 Banque Internationale pour la Centrafrique, Bangui, Central African Republic
 Banque Libano-Française S.A.L., Beirut, Lebanon
 Banque Misr, Cairo, Egypt
 Banque Nagelmackers, Brussels, Belgium
 Banque Nationale Agricole, Tunis, Tunisia
 Banque Nationale de Développement Agricole, Bamako, Mali
 Banque Pharaon & Chiha, Lebanon
 Banque pour le Commerce et l'Industrie – Mer Rouge, Djibouti (City), Djibouti
 Banque Populaire du Rwanda, Kigali, Rwanda
 Banque Populaire Maroco Centrafricaine, Bangui, Central African Republic
 Banque Raiffeisen, Luxembourg, Luxembourg
 Banque Sahélo-Saharienne pour l'Investissement et le Commerce, Tripoli, Libya
 Banque Saudi Fransi, Riyadh, Saudi Arabia
 Banque Transatlantique, Paris, France
 Banque Zitouna, Tunis, Tunisia
 BanRegio, Monterrey, Mexico
 Banrisul, Porto Alegre, Brazil
 Bansi, Guadalajara, Mexico
 Banobras, Mexico City, Mexico
 Banorte, Monterrey, Mexico
 Barclays, London, United Kingdom
 Barclays Africa Group, Johannesburg, South Africa
 Barclays Bank Mauritius, Ebene, Mauritius
 Barclays Bank of Kenya, Nairobi, Kenya
 Barclays Bank of Uganda, Kampala, Uganda
 Barclays Bank Tanzania, Dar es Salaam, Tanzania
 Basellandschaftliche Kantonalbank, Liestal, Switzerland
 Basrah International Bank for Investment, Baghdad, Iraq
 BASIC Bank Limited, Dhaka, Bangladesh
 Basler Kantonalbank, Basel, Switzerland
 Bausparkasse Schwäbisch Hall, Schwäbisch Hall, Germany
 BAWAG P.S.K., Vienna, Austria
 Bayerische Landesbank, München, Germany
 Bayerische Landesbank, Munich, Germany
 BayernLB, Munich, Germany
 Baylake Corp, Sturgeon Bay, United States
 BBBank, Karlsruhe, Germany
 BBCN Bancorp, Los Angeles, United States
 BBVA Banco Frances, Buenos Aires, Argentina
 BBVA Chile, Santiago, Chile
 BBVA Compass, Alabama, USA
 BBVA Continental, Lima, Peru
 BBVA México, Mexico City, Mexico
 BBVA Provincial, Caracas, Venezuela
 BCR Chișinău, Chisinau, Republic of Moldova
 BDO Unibank, Makati City, Philippines
 Belarusbank, Minsk, Belarus
 Belfius, Brussels, Belgium
 Bendigo and Adelaide Bank, Bendigo, Australia
 Beobank, Brussel, Belgium
 Bereke Bank, Almaty, Kazakhstan
 Berenberg Bank, Hamburg, Germany
 Berlin Hyp, Berlin, Germany
 Berliner Sparkasse, Berlin, Germany
 Bermuda Commercial Bank, Hamilton, Bermuda
 Bermuda Monetary Authority, Hamilton, Bermuda
 Berner Kantonalbank, Berne, Switzerland
 Bethmann Bank, Frankfurt am Main, Germany
 Beyond Bank Australia, Adelaide, South Australia
 BGFIBank Group, Libreville, Gabon
 BGL BNP Paribas, Luxembourg, Luxembourg
 BHF Bank, Frankfurt am Main, Germany
 Bhutan National Bank, Thimphu, Bhutan
 Bidvest Bank, Johannesburg, South Africa
 Bilbao Bizkaia Kutxa, Bilbao, Spain
 BIMB Holdings, Kuala Lumpur, Malaysia
 BinckBank, Amsterdam, Netherlands
 Birleşik Fon Bankası, Istanbul, Turkey
 BLOM Bank, Beirut, Lebanon
 Birleşik Fon Bankası, Istanbul, Turkey
 BLC bank, Beirut, Lebanon
 BMCI, Casablanca, Morocco
 BMO Harris Bank, Chicago, United States
 BMW Bank, Munich, Germany
 BNC Bancorp, Thomasville, United States
 BNP Paribas, Paris, France
 BNP Paribas CIB, Paris, France
 BNP Paribas Fortis, Brussels, Belgium
 BNP Paribas Investment Partners, Paris, France
 BOK Financial Corporation, Tulsa, United States
 Bolig- og Næringsbanken, Trondheim, Norway
 Botswana Savings Bank, Gaborone, Botswana
 Boubyan Bank, Safat, Kuwait
 BPCE, Paris, France
 BPER Banca, Modena, Italy
 BRAC Bank Limited, Dhaka, Bangladesh
 Bradford & Bingley, Bingley, United Kingdom
 Brazilian Development Bank, Rio de Janeiro, Brazil
 BRD – Groupe Société Générale, Bucharest, Romania
 Bremer Bank (German bank), Bremen, Germany
 British Arab Commercial Bank, London, United Kingdom
 Brown Shipley, London, United Kingdom
 Banca della Svizzera Italiana, Lugano, Switzerland
 BTA Bank, Almaty, Kazakhstan
 BTA Bank, Tbilisi, Georgia
 BTG Pactual, Rio de Janeiro, Brazil
 Budapest Bank, Budapest, Hungary
 Buffalo Commercial Bank, Juba, South Sudan
 Bulgarian Development Bank, Sofia, Bulgaria
 Burgan Bank, Sharq, Kuwait
 Burj Bank, Karachi, Pakistan
 Busan Bank, Busan, South 
 Butterfield Bank, Hamilton, Bermuda
 Byblos Bank, Beirut, Lebanon
 Byline Bank, Chicago, United States

C

 C. Hoare & Co, London, United Kingdom
 Cairo Amman Bank, Amman, Jordan
 Caisse des dépôts et consignations, Paris, France
 Caixa Económica de Cabo Verde, Praia, Cape Verde
 Caixa Econômica Federal, Rio de Janeiro, Brazil
 Caixa Geral de Depósitos, Lisbon, Portugal
 Caixabank, Barcelona, Spain
 Caixa Rural Galega, Lugo, Spain
 Caja de Ahorros, Panama City, Panama
 Caja de Ahorros y Monte de Piedad de Madrid, Madrid, Spain
 Caja de Ahorros y Monte de Piedad de Navarra, Pamplona, Spain
 Caja General de Ahorros de Canarias, Santa Cruz de Tenerife, Spain
 Caja Murcia, Murcia, Spain
 CajaSur, Cordoba, Spain
 CAL Bank, Accra, Ghana
 California First National Bancorp, Irvine, United States
 Cambodia Asia Bank, Phnom Penh, Cambodia
 Cambodia Commercial Bank, Phnom Penh, Cambodia
 Cambodian Public Bank, Phnom Penh, Cambodia
 Camco Financial Corporation, Cambridge, United States
 Canadia Bank, Phnom Penh, Cambodia
 Canadian Imperial Bank of Commerce, Toronto, Canada
 Canadian Western Bank, Edmonton, Canada
 Canara Bank, Bangalore, India
 Capital Bank (Botswana), Gaborone, Botswana
 Capital Bank (Haiti), Pétion-Ville, Haiti
 Capital Bank of Jordan, Amman, Jordan
 Capital G Bank, Hamilton, Bermuda
 Capital One Bank, Glen Allen, United States
 Capital One Financial Corporation, McLean, United States
 Cardinal Financial Corporation, McLean, United States
 Cargills Bank, Colombo, Sri Lanka
 Carispezia, La Spezia, Italy
 Cascade Bancorp, Bend, United States
 Cassa dei Risparmi di Forlì e della Romagna, Forlì, Italy
 Cassa Depositi e Prestiti, Rome, Italy
 Cassa di Risparmio del Friuli Venezia Giulia, Gorizia, Italy
 Cassa di Risparmio della Provincia di Chieti, Chieti, Italy
 Cassa di Risparmio della Provincia di Viterbo, Viterbo, Italy
 Cassa di Risparmio di Alessandria, Alessandria, Italy
 Cassa di Risparmio di Asti, Asti, Italy
 Cassa di Risparmio di Biella e Vercelli, Biella, Italy
 Cassa di Risparmio di Bolzano-Sudtiroler Sparkasse, Bolzano, Italy
 Cassa di Risparmio di Bra, Bra, Italy
 Cassa di Risparmio di Cento, Cento, Italy
 Cassa di Risparmio di Cesena, Cesena, Italy
 Cassa di Risparmio di Fermo, Fermo, Italy
 Cassa di Risparmio di Ferrara, Ferrara, Italy
 Cassa di Risparmio di Fossano, Fossano, Italy
 Cassa di Risparmio di Genova e Imperia, Genova, Italy
 Cassa di Risparmio di Orvieto, Orvieto, Italy
 Cassa di Risparmio di Pistoia e Pescia, Pistoia, Italy
 Cassa di Risparmio di Ravenna, Ravenna, Italy
 Cassa di Risparmio di Rimini (CARIM), Rimini, Italy
 Cassa di Risparmio di Saluzzo, Saluzzo, Italy
 Cassa di Risparmio di San Miniato, San Miniato, Italy
 Cassa di Risparmio di Venezia, Venice, Italy
 Cassa di Risparmio di Volterra, Volterra, Italy
 Cassa Padana, Leno, Italy
 Catalunya Banc (CatalunyaCaixa), Barcelona, Spain
 Cater Allen, London, England
 Cathay Bank, Los Angeles, United States
 Cathedral Investment Bank, Dominica, Western Antilles
 Cathay General Bancorp, Los Angeles, United States
 Cathay United Bank, Taipei, Taiwan
 Catholic Syrian Bank, Thrissur, India
 Cavmont Bank, Lusaka, Zambia
 CCB Brasil, São Paulo, Brazil
 CDH Investment Bank, Blantyre, Malawi
 CDG Capital, Rabat, Morocco
 CEC Bank, Bucharest, Romania
 Centenary Bank, Kampala, Uganda
 Centennial Bank, Conway, Arkansas, United States
 Central Bank, Provo, Utah, United States
 Central Bank of Argentina, Buenos Aires, Argentina
 Central Bank of Azerbaijan, Baku, Azerbaijan 
 Central Bank of Bahrain, Manama, Bahrain
 Central Bank of Barbados, Bridgetown, Saint Michael
 Central Bank of Bolivia, La Paz, Bolivia
 Central Bank of Bosnia and Herzegovina, Sarajevo, Bosnia and Herzegovina
 Central Bank of Brazil, Brasilia, Brazil
 Central Bank of Chile, Santiago, Chile
 Central Bank of Costa Rica, San José, Costa Rica
 Central Bank of Cyprus, Nicosia, Cyprus
 Central Bank of Djibouti, Djibouti (City), Djibouti
 Central Bank of Egypt, Cairo, Egypt
 Central Bank of Eswatini, Mbabane, Eswatini
 Central Bank of Iceland, Reykjavik, Iceland
 Central Bank of India, Mumbai, India
 Central Bank of Iran, Tehran, Iran
 Central Bank of Iraq, Baghdad, Iraq
 Central Bank of Kenya, Nairobi, Kenya
 Central Bank of Kuwait, Kuwait City, Kuwait
 Central Bank of Lesotho, Lesotho, South Africa
 Central Bank of Liberia, Monrovia, Liberia
 Central Bank of Libya, Tripoli, Liberia
 Central Bank of Madagascar, Malagasy, Madagascar
 Central Bank of Malta, Valletta, Malta 
 Central Bank of Mauritania, Nouakchott, Mauritania
 Central Bank of Montenegro, Podgorica, Montenegro
 Central Bank of Nicaragua, Managua, Nicaragua
 Central Bank of Nigeria, Abuja, Nigeria
 Central Bank of Paraguay, Asunción, Paraguay
 Central Bank of The Gambia, Banjul, The Gambia
 Central Bank of the Democratic People's Republic of Korea, Pyongyang, North Korea
 Central Bank of the Republic of China (Taiwan), Zhongzheng, Taipei
 Central Bank of the Republic of Turkey, Ankara, Turkey
 Central Bank of the United Arab Emirates, Abu Dhabi, United Arab Emirates
 Central Bank of Tunisia, Tunis, Tunisia
 Central Bank of Turkmenistan, Ashgabat, Turkmenistan
 Central Bank of Samoa, Apia, Samoa
 Central Bank of São Tomé and Príncipe, Sao Tome, Central Africa
 Central Bank of Somalia, Mogadishu, Somalia
 Central Bank of Seychelles, Victoria, Seychelles
 Central Bank of Suriname, Paramaribo, Suriname
 Central Bank of Syria, Damascus, Syria
 Central Bank of the Republic of Guinea, Guinea 
 Central Bank of the Turkish Republic of Northern Cyprus, North Nicosia, Northern Cyprus
 Central Bank of Uruguay, Montevideo, Uruguay
 Central Bank of Uzbekistan, Uzbekistan 
 Central Bank of Venezuela, Caracas, Venezuela
 Central Bank of West African States, Dakar, Senegal
 Central Bank of Yemen, Aden, Yemen
 Central Cooperative Bank, Sofia, Bulgaria
 Central Pacific Financial Corp., Honolulu, United States
 Central Reserve Bank of Peru, Lima, Peru
 Century Bank Limited, Putalisadak, Kathmandu 
 Československá obchodní banka, Prague, Slovakia
 Cetelem, Paris, France
 Cham Bank, Damascus, Syria
 Chang Hwa Bank, Taipei, Taiwan
 Chase Bank, New York, United States
 Chase Bank Kenya Limited, Nairobi, Kenya
 ChiantiBanca, Monteriggioni, Italy
 Chiba Bank, Chiba, Japan
 China Banking Corporation, Makati City, Philippines
 China Bohai Bank, Tianjin, China
 China Citic Bank, Beijing, China
 China Construction Bank Corporation, Beijing, China
 China Construction Bank (Macau), Macau, China
 China Everbright Bank, Beijing, China
 China Guangfa Bank, Guangzhou, China
 China Merchants Bank, Shenzhen, China
 China Minsheng Bank, Beijing, China
 China Zheshang Bank, Ningbo, China
 Chiyu Banking Corporation, Hong Kong, Hong Kong
 Chong Hing Bank, Hong Kong, Hong Kong
 CIB Bank, Budapest, Hungary
 CIBC Bank USA, Chicago, United States
 CIBC FirstCaribbean International Bank, Warrens, Barbados
 CIMB Group, Kuala Lumpur, Malaysia
 CIMB Niaga, Jakarta, Indonesia
 CIT Group, Livingston, United States
 Citadele Banka, Riga, Latvia
 Citibank Argentina, Buenos Aires, Argentina
 Citibank Australia, Sydney, Australia
 Citibank Bahrain, Manama, Bahrain
 Citibank Canada, Toronto, Canada
 Citibank (China), Shanghai, China
 Citibank Ecuador, Guayaquil, Ecuador
 Citibank Europe, Dublin, Ireland
 Citibank (Hong Kong), Hong Kong, China
 Citibank India, Mumbai, India
 Citibank Indonesia, Jakarta, Indonesia
 Citibank Korea, Seoul, South Korea
 Citibank Malaysia, Kuala Lumpur, Malaysia
 Citibank Singapore Marina View, Singapore
 Citibank Thailand, Bangkok, Thailand
 Citibank Uganda, Kampala, Uganda
 Citibank United Arab Emirates, Dubai, United Arab Emirates 
 Citibank, New York, United States
 CITIC Bank International, Hong Kong, China
 Citigroup, New York, United States
 Citizens Republic Bancorp, Flint, Michigan, United States
 City National Bank (California), Los Angeles, California
 City National Corporation, Beverly Hills, United States
 City Union Bank, Kumbakonam, India
 Civil Bank Limited, Kamaladi, Kathmandu
 Clarien Bank, Hamilton, Bermuda
 Close Brothers Group, London, United Kingdom
 Clydesdale Bank, Glasgow, United Kingdom
 Comdirect, Quickborn, Germany
 Comerica, Dallas, United States
 Commerce Bancshares, Kansas City, United States
 Commercial Bank Centrafrique, Bangui, Central African Republic
 Commercial Bank Group, Douala, Cameroon
 Commercial Bank of Africa, Nairobi, Kenya
 Commercial Bank of Africa (Tanzania), Dar es Salaam, Tanzania
 Commercial Bank of Cameroon, Douala, Cameroon
 Commercial Bank of Ceylon, Colombo, Sri Lanka
 Commercial Bank of Dubai, Dubai, United Arab Emirates
 Commercial Bank of Eritrea, Asmara, Eritrea
 Commercial Bank of Ethiopia, Addis Ababa, Ethiopia
 Commercial Bank of Kuwait, Safat, Kuwait
 Commercial Bank of Syria, Damascus, Syria
 Commerzbank, Frankfurt am Main, Germany
 Commonwealth Bank, Sydney, Australia
 Community Bank Bangladesh Limited, Bangladesh 
 Community Bank System, DeWitt, New York, United States
 Community West Bancshares, Goleta, United States
 CommunityOne Bancorp, Asheboro, United States
 Compagnie Financière Edmond de Rothschild, Paris, France
 Compagnie Générale de Banque, Kigali, Rwanda
 Compagnie Monégasque de Banque, Monte Carlo, Monaco
 Compartamos Banco, Mexico City, Mexico
 Consolidated Bank of Kenya, Nairobi, Kenya
 Consorsbank, Nürnberg, Germany
 Consors Finanz, Munich, Germany
 Continental Bank of Canada, Toronto, Canada
 Cooperative Bank, Skopje, Macedonia
 Cooperative Bank, Yangon, Myanmar
 Cooperative Bank, Wellington, New Zealand
 Co-operative Bank of Kenya, Nairobi, Kenya
 Cooperative Bank of Oromia, Addis Ababa, Ethiopia
 Corporate Commercial Bank, Sofia, Bulgaria
 Corporation Bank, Mangalore, India
 Cosmos Bank, Pune, India
 COTA Commercial Bank, Taichung, Taiwan
 Coventry Building Society, Coventry, United Kingdom
 Crane Bank, Kampala, Uganda
 CRDB Bank, Dar es Salaam, Tanzania
 Credins Bank, Tirana, Albania
 Crediop, Rome, Italy
 Credit Agricole, Montrouge, France
 Crédit Agricole Cariparma, Parma, Italy
 Credit Agricole CIB, Paris, France
 Credit Agricole CIB Hungary, Budapest, Hungary
 Credit Agricole CIB Ukraine, Kyiv, Ukraine
 Crédit Agricole Corporate and Investment Bank, Paris, France
 Credit Agricole Egypt, Cairo, Egypt
 Crédit Agricole Italia, Parma, Italy
 Credit Agricole Srbija, Novi Sad, Serbia
 Crèdit Andorrà, Andorra la Vella, Andorra
 Credit Bank, Ulaanbataar, Mongolia
 Credit Bank, Nairobi, Kenya
 Credit Bank of Albania, Tirana, Albania
 Credit Bank of Moscow, Moscow, Russia
 Crédit Industriel et Commercial (CIC), Paris, France
 Crédit du Nord, Paris, France
 Credit Europe Bank, Amsterdam, Netherlands
 Crédit Foncier de France, Charenton, France
 Credit Immobilier et Hotelier (CIH), Casablanca, Morocco
 Credit Industriel et Commercial (CIC), Paris, France
 Credit Lyonnais, Paris, France
 Credit Mutuel, Paris, France
 Credit Suisse Group, Zurich, Switzerland
 Credito Bergamasco, Bergamo, Italy
 Credito Emiliano, Reggio Emilia, Italy
 Credito Fondiario (Fonspa), Rome, Italy
 Credito Siciliano, Acireale, Italy
 Credito Valtellinese, Sondrio, Italy
 Crelan, Brussels, Belgium
 Croatian National Bank, Zagreb, Croatia
 CS Alterna Bank, Ottawa, Canada
 CSCBank SAL, Beirut, Lebanon
 CTBC Bank, Taipei, Taiwan
 CTBC Bank (Canada), Vancouver, Canada
 CTBC Financial Holding, Taipei, Taiwan
 Cultura Sparebank, Oslo, Norway
 Cyprus Development Bank, Nicosia, Cyprus

D

 Da Afghanistan Bank, Kabul, Afghanistan
 DAB BNP Paribas, Munich, Germany
 Daedong Credit Bank, Pyongyang, North Korea
 Dah Sing Bank, Hong Kong, China
 Danske Bank, Copenhagen, Denmark
 Danske Bank (Norway), Trondheim, Norway
 Danske Bank (Northern Ireland), Belfast, Northern Ireland
 Dar es Salaam Community Bank, Dar es Salaam, Tanzania
 Dar Es Salaam Investment Bank, Baghdad, Iraq
 Davivienda, Bogotá, Colombia
 Daycoval, São Paulo, Brazil
 DBS Bank, Singapore, Singapore
 DBS Bank (Hong Kong), Hong Kong, China
 DCB Bank, Mumbai, India
 Degussa Bank, Frankfurt am Main, Germany
 DekaBank Deutsche Girozentrale, Berlin, Germany
 DekaBank (Germany), Frankfurt am Main, Germany
 Delta Bank, Minsk, Belarus
 Delta Bank, Kyiv, Ukraine
 Dena Bank, Mumbai, India
 De Nederlandsche Bank, Amsterdam, Netherlands
 Denizbank, Istanbul, Turkey
 Denmark Bancshares, Denmark, Wisconsin, United States
 Desjardins Group, Levis, Canada
 De Surinaamsche Bank, Paramaribo, Suriname
 Deutsche Apotheker- und Ärztebank, Düsseldorf, Germany
 Deutsche Bank, Frankfurt am Main, Germany
 Deutsche Bank (Italy), Milano, Italy
 Deutsche Bundesbank, Frankfurt am Main, Germany
 Deutsche Hypothekenbank, Hannover, Germany
 Deutsche Pfandbriefbank, Unterschleißheim, Germany
 Deutsche Postbank, Bonn, Germany
 Deutsche Kreditbank, Berlin, Germany
 Deutsche WertpapierService Bank, Frankfurt am Main, Germany
 Deutsche Zentral-Genossenschaftsbank, Frankfurt am Main, Germany
 Deutscher Sparkassen- und Giroverband, Berlin, Germany
 Development Bank of Ethiopia, Addis Ababa, Ethiopia
 Development Bank of Kenya, Nairobi, Kenya
 Development Bank of the Philippines (DBP), Makati City, Philippines
 Development Bank of Vojvodina, Novi Sad, Serbia
 Development Credit Bank, Mumbai, India
 Development Finance Corporation Belize, Belmopan, Belize
 De Volksbank, Utrecht, Netherlands
 Dexia, Brussels, Belgium
 DFCC Bank, Colombo, Sri Lanka
 DFCU Group, Kampala, Uganda
 DGB Financial Group, Daegu, South Korea
 Dhaka Bank, Dhaka, Bangladesh
 Dhaka Bank Limited, Dhaka, Bangladesh
 Dhanalakshmi Bank, Thrissur, India
 Dhanlaxmi Bank, Kerala, India
 DHB Bank, Rotterdam, Netherlands
 Diamond Bank, Lagos, Nigeria
 Diamond Trust Bank Group, Nairobi, Kenya
 Diamond Trust Bank (Tanzania) Limited, Dar es Salaam, Tanzania
 Diamond Trust Bank (Uganda), Kampala, Uganda
 Die Zweite Sparkasse, Vienna, Austria
 Dime Community Bank, Brooklyn, United States
 Direktna Banka, Kragujevac, Serbia
 Discover Financial Services, Riverwoods, Illinois, United States
 DNB ASA, Oslo, Norway
 Dnister, Lviv, Ukraine
 doBank, Verona, Italy
 Donner & Reuschel, Hamburg, Germany
 Doral Financial Corporation, San Juan, Puerto Rico
 DSK Bank, Sofia, Bulgaria
 DSK Hyp, Frankfurt, Germany
 Dresdner Bank, Frankfurt, Germany
 Dubai Bank, Dubai, United Arab Emirates
 Dubai Bank Kenya, Nairobi, Kenya
 Dubai Islamic Bank, Dubai, United Arab Emirates
 Dubai Islamic Bank Pakistan, Karachi, Pakistan
 Dutch Bangla Bank, Dhaka, Bangladesh
 Düsseldorfer Hypothekenbank, Düsseldorf, Germany
 DVB Bank, Frankfurt am Main, Germany
 Dyer & Blair Investment Bank, Nairobi, Kenya
 DZ Bank, Frankfurt am Main, Germany

E
 
 Eagle Bancorp, Bethesda, Maryland, United States
 East West Bancorp, Pasadena, United States
 Eastern Bank Ltd, Dhaka, Bangladesh
 Eastern Bank, Boston, United States
 Eastern Bank Ltd, London, UK
 Eastern Caribbean Central Bank, Basseterre, St. Kitts    
 Ecobank Ghana Limited, Accra, Ghana
 Ecobank Kenya, Nairobi, Kenya
 Ecobank Nigeria, Lagos, Nigeria
 Ecobank Rwanda, Kigali, Rwanda
 Ecobank Transnational, Lomé, Togo
 Ecobank Uganda, Kampala, Uganda
 Ecobank Zimbabwe, Harare, Zimbabwe
 Edekabank, Hamburg, Germany
 Educational Services of America, Knoxville, United States
 EFG Group, Geneva, Switzerland
 EFG International, Zurich, Switzerland
 Egg, London, United Kingdom
 Emigrant Savings Bank, New York, United States
 Emirates Islamic Bank, Dubai, United Arab Emirates
 Emirates NBD, Dubai, United Arab Emirates
 Emporiki Bank, Athens, Greece
 EN Bank, Tehran, Iran
 EON Bank, Kuala Lumpur, Malaysia
 eQ Bank, Helsinki, Finland
 Equatorial Commercial Bank, Nairobi, Kenya
 Equitas Small Finance Bank, Chennai, India
 Equity Bank Kenya Limited, Nairobi, Kenya
 Equity Bank Uganda Limited, Kampala, Uganda
 Equity Group Holdings Limited, Nairobi, Kenya
 E.SUN Commercial Bank, Taipei, Taiwan
 Etibank, Istanbul, Turkey
 Eritrean Investment and Development Bank, Asmara, Eritrea
 Erste Bank Novi Sad, Novi Sad, Serbia
 Erste Group, Vienna, Austria
 ESAF Small Finance Bank, Mannuthy, Thrissur
 Espírito Santo Financial Group, Luxembourg, Luxembourg
 Euler Hermes, Paris, France
 Eurasian Bank, Almaty, Kazakhstan 
 Euro Bank, Wroclaw, Poland
 Eurobank a.d., Belgrade, Serbia
 Eurobank Bulgaria (Postbank), Sofia, Bulgaria
 Eurobank Ergasias, Athens, Greece
 Eurocity Bank, Frankfurt, Germany
 Eurohypo, Frankfurt, Germany
 EverBank, Jacksonville, Florida, United States
 Everest Bank, Kathmandu, Nepal
 EVO Banco, Madrid, Spain
 Evocabank, Yerevan, Armenia 
 Evrofinance Mosnarbank, Moscow, Russia
 Exchange Bank of Canada, Toronto, Canada
 Exim Bank (Bangladesh), Dhaka, Bangladesh
 Exim Bank (Tanzania), Dar es Salaam, Tanzania
 Exim Bank (Uganda), Kampala, Uganda
 Export Development Bank of Iran, Tehran, Iran
 Export–Import Bank of Romania, Bucharest, Romania
 Export–Import Bank of Korea, Seoul, South Korea
 Export-Import Bank of Thailand, Bangkok, Thailand
 Export-Import Bank of the Republic of China, Taipei, Taiwan
 Export–Import Bank of the United States, Washington, D.C., United States
 Express Bank, Baku, Azerbaijan

F

 F.N.B. Corp, Hermitage, United States
 Faisal Islamic Bank of Egypt, Giza, Egypt
 Faisal Islamic Bank of Sudan, Khartoum, Sudan
 Family Bank, Nairobi, Kenya
 Far Eastern Bank, Singapore, Singapore
 Faysal Bank, Karachi, Pakistan
 FCA Bank, Turin, Italy
 FDH Bank, Blantyre, Madagascar
 Federal Bank, Alwaye, India
 Federal Bank of the Middle East, Dar es Salaam, Tanzania
 FFA Private Bank, Beirut, Lebanon
 FHB Mortgage Bank, Budapest, Hungary
 Fibabanka, Istanbul, Turkey
 Fidelity Bank Ghana, Accra, Ghana
 Fidelity Bank Nigeria, Lagos State, Nigeria
 Fidelity Southern Corporation, Atlanta, United States
 Fidi Toscana, Florence, Italy
 Fidobank, Kyiv, Ukraine
 Fifth Third Bancorp, Cincinnati, United States
 FIH Erhvervsbank, Copenhagen, Denmark
 Finance House, Abu Dhabi, United Arab Emirates
 Financial Bank Benin, Cotonou, Benin
 Financial Institutions, Warsaw, New York, United States
 Finansbank, Istanbul, Turkey
 Finco Services Inc, United States
 FINECO, Brescia, Italy
 First Abu Dhabi Bank, Abu Dhabi, United Arab Emirates
 First Alliance Bank Zambia Limited, Lusaka, Zambia
 First American International Bank, Brooklyn, United States
 First Bancorp, Damariscotta, United States
 First BanCorp, San Juan, Puerto Rico
 First Bancorp, Troy, North Carolina, United States
 First Bancorp, Lebanon, Virginia, United States
 First Bank of Nigeria, Lagos, Nigeria
 First Busey Corporation, Champaign, United States
 First Business Bank (FBB), Athens, Greece
 First Citizens BancShares, Dyersburg, United States
 First Citizens BancShares, Raleigh, United States
 First Citizens Bank, Port of Spain, Trinidad and Tobago
 First City Monument Bank, Lagos, Nigeria
 First Community Bank, Nairobi, Kenya
 First Community Bancshares, Killeen, Texas, United States
 First Community Bancshares, Bluefield, United States
 First Financial Bancorp, Cincinnati, United States
 First Guaranty Bancshares, Hammond, United States
 First Gulf Bank, Abu Dhabi, United Arab Emirates
 First Horizon National Corporation, Memphis, United States
 First International Bank of Israel (FIBI), Tel Aviv, Israel
 First Interstate BancSystem, Billings, United States
 First Investment Bank, Sofia, Bulgaria
 First Investment Bank (PJSC), Kyiv, Ukraine
 First Merchant Bank, Blantyre, Malawi
 First Merchants Corporation, Muncie, United States
 First Midwest Bancorp, Itasca, United States
 First MicroFinance Bank (Afghanistan), Afghanistan
 First MicroFinance Bank (Tajikistan), Tajikistan 
 First National Bank of Botswana, Gaborone, Botswana
 First National Bank of Omaha, New York, United States
 First Nations Bank of Canada, Saskatoon, Canada
 First National of Nebraska, Omaha, United States
 First International Bank (Liberia), Monrovia, Liberia
 First National Bank (South Africa), Botswana, South Africa
 First Niagara Financial Group, Buffalo, United States
 First Security Islami Bank Limited, Dhaka, Bangladesh
 First Somali Bank, Mogadishu, Somalia
 First Ukrainian International Bank, Kyiv, Ukraine
 First Westroads Bank, Omaha, United States
 First Women Bank Limited, Karachi, Pakistan 
 FirstCaribbean International Bank, St Michael, Barbados
 FirstMerit Corporation, Akron, United States
 FirstRand, Sandton, South Africa
 Fondo Común, Caracas, Venezuela
 Foreign Trade Bank of the Democratic People's Republic of Korea, Pyongyang, North Korea
 Forex Bank, Stockholm, Sweden
 Fonkoze, Port-au-Prince, Haiti
 Frankfurter Volksbank, Frankfurt, Germany
 Fransabank, Beirut, Lebanon
 François Desjardins, Montreal, Canada
 Fubon Bank (Hong Kong), Hong Kong, China
 Fubon Financial Holding Co., Taipei, Taiwan
 Fukuoka Financial Group, Fukuoka, Japan
 Fulton Financial Corp, Lancaster, United States
 Future Bank, Manama, Bahrain
 Fürst Fugger Privatbank, Augsburg, Germany
 Fürstlich Castell'sche Bank, Würzburg, Germany

G

 Garanti Bank, Levent, Turkey
 Garanti BBVA, Istanbul, Turkey
 Gazprombank, Moscow, Russia
 GCB Bank, Accra, Ghana
 GEFA Bank, Wuppertal, Germany
 Geniki Bank, Athens, Greece
 Getin Bank, Warsaw, Poland
 Getin Noble Bank, Warsaw, Poland
 GFH BSC, Bahrain 
 GFH Financial Group, Manama, Bahrain
 Ghana Commercial Bank, Accra, Ghana
 Ghavamin Bank, Tehran, Iran
 Giro Commercial Bank, Nairobi, Kenya
 Girobank, Willemstad, Netherlands Antilles
 Glacier Bancorp, Kalispell, United States
 Glarner Kantonalbank, Glarus, Switzerland
 GLS Bank, Bochum, Germany
 Global Bank Liberia, Monrovia, Liberia
 Global Commerce Bank, Georgia, United States
 Golden Bank, Housten, United States
 Golomt Bank, Ulaanbataar, Mongolia
 Government Savings Bank, Bangkok, Thailand
 Graubundner Kantonalbank, Chur, Switzerland
 Grameen Bank, Dhaka, Bangladesh
 Greater Bank, Hamilton, Australia
 Grong Sparebank, Grong, Norway
 Groupe Banque Populaire, Paris, France
 Groupe BPCE, Paris, France
 Groupe Caisse d'Epargne, Paris, France
 Grupo Financiero Banamex, Mexico City, Mexico
 Grupo Financiero Banorte, Mexico City, Mexico
 Grupo Financiero BBVA Bancomer, Mexico City, Mexico
 Grupo Financiero Galicia, Buenos Aires, Argentina
 Grupo Financiero Santander México, Mexico City, Mexico
 Guaranty Trust Bank, Lagos, Nigeria
 Guaranty Trust Bank (Kenya), Nairobi, Kenya
 Guaranty Trust Bank (Rwanda), Kigali, Rwanda
 Guaranty Trust Bank (Uganda), Kampala, Uganda
 Guardian Bank, Nairobi, Kenya
 Gulf African Bank, Nairobi, Kenya
 Gulf Bank of Kuwait, Kuwait City, Kuwait
 Gulf Commercial Bank, Baghdad, Iraq
 Gulf Finance House, Manama, Bahrain
 Gulf International Bank, Manama, Bahrain

H

 Habib Bank AG Zurich, Zurich, Switzerland
 Habib Metropolitan Bank, Karachi, Pakistan
 HabibMetro, Karachi, Pakistan
 Halk Bank, Ashgabat, Turkmenistan
 Halkbank a.d., Belgrade, Serbia
 Halkbank, Ankara, Turkey
 Halyk Bank, Almaty, Kazakhstan
 Hamburger Sparkasse, Hamburg, Germany
 Hana Financial Group, Seoul, South Korea
 Hang Seng Bank, Hong Kong, Hong Kong
 Hanseatic Bank, Hamburg, Germany
 Harbin Bank, Harbin, China
 Hatton National Bank, Colombo, Sri Lanka
 Hauck & Aufhäuser, Frankfurt, Germany
 HBL Pakistan, Habib Bank Limited Karachi, Pakistan
 HBOS, Edinburgh, United Kingdom
 HBZ Bank, Durban, South Africa
 HDFC Bank, Mumbai, India
 Helaba, Frankfurt am Main, Germany
 Helgeland Sparebank, Mosjøen, Norway
 Hellenic Bank, Strovolos, Cyprus
 Hello bank!, Paris, France
 Heritage Bank, Queensland, Australia
 Himalayan Bank, Kathmandu, Nepal
 Hoerner Bank, Heilbronn, Germany
 Høland og Setskog Sparebank, Bjørkelangen, Norway
 Hokkaido Bank, Sapporo, Japan
 Hokkoku Bank, Kanazawa, Japan
 Hokuriku Bank, Toyama, Japan
 Hokuto Bank, Akita, Japan
 Home Bancshares, Conway, United States
 Home Credit and Finance Bank, Moscow, Russia
 Home Credit & Finance Bank, Moscow, Russia
 Home Credit Bank Belarus, Minsk, Belarus
 Home Credit Bank Kazakhstan, Almaty, Kazakhstan
 Home Credit Czech Republic, Brno, Czech Republic
 Home Credit Slovakia, Piestany, Slovakia
 Hong Leong Bank, Kuala Lumpur, Malaysia
 Horizon Bancorp, Michigan City, United States
 Housing Finance Company of Kenya, Nairobi, Kenya
 Housing Financing Fund, Reykjavik, Iceland
 Hrvatska poštanska banka, Zagreb, Croatia
 HSBC Bank, London, United Kingdom
 HSBC Bank Argentina, Buenos Aires, Argentina
 HSBC Bank Australia, Sydney, Australia
 HSBC Bank Bermuda, Hamilton, Bermuda
 HSBC Bank Canada, Vancouver, Canada
 HSBC Bank (Chile), Santiago, Chile
 HSBC Bank Egypt, Cairo, Egypt
 HSBC Bank Malaysia, Kuala Lumpur, Malaysia
 HSBC Bank Malta, Valletta, Malta
 HSBC Bank Middle East, Saint Helier, Jersey
 HSBC Bank Polska, Warsaw, Poland
 HSBC Bank (Taiwan), Taipei, Taiwan
 HSBC Bank (Turkey), Istanbul, Turkey
 HSBC Bank USA, New York, United States
 HSBC France, Paris, France
 HSBC Holdings, London, United Kingdom
 HSBC Saudi Arabia, Riyadh, Saudi Arabia
 HSBC Sri Lanka, Colombo, Sri Lanka
 HSBC Trinkaus, Düsseldorf, Germany
 HSBC México, Mexico City, Mexico
 HSH Nordbank, Hamburg, Germany
 Hua Xia Bank, Beijing, China
 Hudson City Bancorp, Paramus, United States
 Hume Bank, Albury, Australia
 Hungarian National Bank, Budapest, Hungary
 Huntington Bancshares, Columbus, United States
 Hypo Alpe Adria Bank Beograd, Belgrade, Serbia
 Hypo Alpe Adria Bank Croatia, Zagreb, Croatia
 Hypo Alpe Adria Bank dd Banja Luka, Mostar, Bosnia-Herzegovina
 Hypo Alpe Adria Bank dd Mostar, Mostar, Bosnia-Herzegovina
 Hypo Alpe Adria Bank International, Klagenfurt, Austria
 Hypo Alpe Adria Bank Italy, Unknown, Italy
 Hypo Alpe Adria Bank Montenegro, Podgorica, Montenegro
 Hypo Alpe Adria Bank Slovenia, Ljubljana, Slovenia
 Hypo Noe Landesbank, Sankt Pölten, Austria
 Hypo Real Estate Holding, Munich, Germany
 HypoVereinsbank, Munich, Germany

I

 Ibercaja Banco, Zaragoza, Spain
 ICBC Turkey, Istanbul, Turkey
 ICCREA Holding, Roma, Italy
 ICICI Bank, Mumbai, India
 ICICI Bank Canada, Toronto, Canada
 IDBI, Mumbai, India
 Idea Bank, Warsaw, Poland
 Idea Bank (Romania), Bucharest, Romania
 IDFC First Bank, Mumbai, India
 IFIC Bank, Dhaka, Bangladesh
 IKB Deutsche Industriebank, Düsseldorf, Germany
 İlbank, Ulus, Turkey
 IMB Banking & Financial Services, Wollongong, Australia
 Imexbank, Odessa, Ukraine
 Imperial Bank Limited, Nairobi, Kenya
 Inbursa, Mexico City, Mexico
 Indian Bank, Chennai, India
 Indian Overseas Bank, Chennai, India
 Indre Sogn Sparebank, Årdalstangen, Norway
 Indo-Zambia Bank Limited, Lusaka, Zambia
 IndusInd Bank, Mumbai, India
 Industrial and Commercial Bank of China (Asia), Hong Kong, China
 Industrial and Commercial Bank of China (Macau), Macau, China
 Industrial Bank (China), Fuzhou, China
 Industrial Bank of Iraq, Baghdad, Iraq
 Industrial Bank of Korea, Seoul, South Korea
 Industrial Bank of Kuwait, Safat, Kuwait
 Industrial Bank (Washington D.C.), Washington D.C., United States
 Industrial Development Bank, Karachi, Pakistan
 InecoBank, Yerevan, Armenia
 ING Australia, Sydney, Australia
 ING Bank, Amsterdam, Netherlands
 ING Bank Śląski, Katowice, Poland
 ING Belgium, Brussels, Belgium
 ING DiBa, Frankfurt am Main, Germany
 ING Group, Amsterdam, Netherlands
 ING Vysya Bank, Bangalore, India
 Insinger de Beaufort, Luxembourg, Luxembourg
 Innwa Bank, Yangon, Myanmar
 Istituto per il Credito Sportivo, Rome, Italy
 Inter-American Development Bank, Washington D,C, United States
 Interbank, Kyiv, Ukraine
 Interbank Burundi, Bujumbura, Burundi
 Intercontinental Bank, Lagos, Nigeria
 International Bancshares Corp, Laredo, United States
 International Bank of Azerbaijan (IBA), Baku, Azerbaijan
 International Bank of Azerbaijan-Georgia, Tbilisi, Georgia
 International Bank of Qatar, Doha, Qatar
 Internationales Bankenhaus Bodensee, Friedrichshafen, Germany
 International Investment Bank, Budapest, Hungary
 Intesa Sanpaolo, Torino, Italy
 Intesa Sanpaolo Bank (Albania), Tirana, Albania
 Intesa Sanpaolo Bank Ireland, Dublin, Ireland
 Intesa Sanpaolo Bank Romania, Arad, Romania
 Intesa Sanpaolo Banka Bosnia/Herzegovina, Sarajevo, Bosnia-Herzegovina
 Investcorp, Manama, Bahrain
 Investec Bank, London, United Kingdom
 Investitionsbank Berlin, Berlin, Germany
 Investment Bank of Greece, Athens, Greece
 Investors Bank, New Jersey, United States
 Investrust Bank, Lusaka, Zambia
 Iraqi Islamic Bank, Baghdad, Iraq
 Iranian-European Bank, Hamburg, Germany
 Iran-Venezuela Bi-National Bank, Tehran, Iran
 Isbank, Moscow, Russia
 Islamic Bank of Britain, Birmingham, United Kingdom
 Islamic Cooperation Investment Bank, Tehran, Iran
 Islamic International Arab Bank, Amman, Jordan
 Islandsbanki, Reykjavik, Iceland
 Israel Discount Bank, Tel Aviv, Israel
 Istituto Centrale delle Banche Popolari Italiane, Milano, Italy
 Istrobanka, Bratislava, Slovakia
 İş Yatırım, Istanbul, Turkey
 Itaú Corpbanca, Santiago, Chile
 Itau Unibanco Holding S.A., São Paulo, Brazil
 Ithmaar Bank, Manama, Bahrain
 Ivory Bank, Juba, South Sudan
 IWBank, Milan, Italy
 I&M Bank Limited, Nairobi, Kenya
 I&M Bank Tanzania Limited, Dar es Salaam, Tanzania
 I&M Bank Rwanda Limited, Kigali, Rwanda

J

 Jæren Sparebank, Bryne, Norway
 Jamii Bora Bank, Nairobi, Kenya
 Jammu & Kashmir Bank, Srinagar, India
 Jamuna Bank, Dhaka, Bangladesh
 Janata Bank, Dhaka, Bangladesh
 Janata Bank Nepal Limited, Kathmandu, Nepal
 Japan Post Bank, Tokyo, Japan
 Jefferies Group, New York, United States
 Jio Payments Bank, Mumbai, India
 Johnson Financial Group, Racine, United States
 Joint Stock Commercial Bank for Foreign Trade of Vietnam, Hanoi, Vietnam
 Jordan Ahli Bank, Amman, Jordan
 Jordan Kuwait Bank, Amman, Jordan
 Joyo Bank, Mito, Japan
 JP Morgan, Frankfurt am Main, Germany
 JP Morgan Chase & Co, New York, United States
 JS Bank, Karachi, Pakistan
 Jubanka, Belgrade, Serbia
 Jubilee Bank, Dhaka, Bangladesh
 JUBMES banka, Belgrade, Serbia
 Julian Hodge Bank, Cardiff, United Kingdom
 Julius Baer Group, Zurich, Switzerland
 Juniper Advisory, Chicago, United States
 Jyske Bank, Silkeborg, Denmark

K

 Kabul Bank, Kabul, Afghanistan
 Kanbawza Bank, Yangon, Myanmar
 Kanto Tsukuba Bank, Tsuchiura City, Japan
 Kapital Bank, Baku, Azerbaijan
 Karafarin Bank, Tehran, Iran
 Kardan Investment Bank, Tehran, Iran
 Karmasangsthan Bank, Dhaka, Bangladesh
 Karnataka Bank, Mangalore, India
 Karur Vysya Bank, Karur, India
 KASB Bank, Karachi, Pakistan
 Kasikornbank, Bangkok, Thailand
 Kazinvestbank, Almaty, Kazakhstan
 Kazkommertsbank, Almaty, Kazakhstan
 KB Financial Group Inc, Seoul, South Korea
 KBC Bank, Brussels, Belgium
 KBC Bank Ireland, Dublin, Ireland
 KCB Bank Kenya Limited, Nairobi, Kenya
 KCB Bank Rwanda Limited, Kigali, Rwanda
 KBC Group, Brussels, Belgium
 KCB Bank South Sudan Limited, Juba, South Sudan
 KCB Bank Uganda Limited, Kampala, Uganda
 KD-Bank, Dortmund, Germany
 Kempen & Co, Amsterdam, Netherlands
 Kenya Commercial Bank, Nairobi, Kenya
 KeyBank, Cleveland, United States
 KeyCorp, Cleveland, United States
 Keytrade Bank, Brussels, Belgium
 KfW Bank, Frankfurt, Germany
 KfW IPEX-Bank, Frankfurt, Germany
 KGI Bank, Taipei, Taiwan
 Khaleeji Commercial Bank, Manama, Bahrain
 Khushhali Bank, Islamabad, Pakistan
 Kiatnakin Bank, Bangkok, Thailand
 Kiwibank, Wellington, New Zealand
 Klakki, Reykjavik, Iceland 
 Komercni banka, Prague, Czech Republic
 Komercijalna banka, Belgrade, Serbia
 Komercijalna banka Budva, Budva, Serbia
 Komerční banka Bratislava, Bratislava, Slovakia
 Korea Development Bank, Seoul, South Korea
 Korea Exchange Bank, Seoul, South Korea
 Kotak Mahindra Bank, Mumbai, India
 KredoBank, Lviv, Ukraine
 Kreissparkasse Ludwigsburg, Ludwigsburg, Germany
 Krung Thai Bank, Bangkok, Thailand
 Kumari Bank, Kathmandu, Nepal
 Kutxabank, Bilbao, Spain
 Kuwait Finance House, Safat, Kuwait
 Kuwait International Bank, Safat, Kuwait
 K&H Bank, Budapest, Hungary

L

 La Banque Postale, Paris, France
 La Caixa, Valencia, Spain
 Laiki Bank, Thessaloniki, Greece
 Lakshmi Vilas Bank, Karur, India
 Land Bank of Taiwan, Taipei, Taiwan
 Landesbank Baden-Württemberg (LBBW), Stuttgart, Germany
 Landesbank Berlin Holding (LBB), Berlin, Germany
 Landesbank Saar, Saarbrücken, Germany
 Landkreditt Bank, Oslo, Norway
 Landsbankinn, Reykjavik, Iceland
 Landwirtschaftliche Rentenbank, Frankfurt am Main, Germany
 Lansforsakringar Bank, Stockholm, Sweden
 Latvijas Krājbanka, Riga, Latvia
 Laurentian Bank of Canada, Montreal, Canada
 Lauritzen Corporation, Omaha, United States
 Laxmi Bank, Kathmandu, Nepal
 LCL S.A., Lyon, France
 Lebanese Swiss Bank, Beirut, Lebanon
 Leeds Building Society, Leeds, United Kingdom
 Letshego Bank Tanzania, Dar es Salaam, Tanzania
 LGT Group, Vaduz, Liechtenstein
 Liberbank, Madrid, Spain
 Liberty Bank (Georgia), Tbilisi, Georgia
 Libyan Foreign Bank, Tripoli, Libya
 Liechtensteinische Landesbank, Vaduz, Liechtenstein
 Lloyds Banking Group, London, United Kingdom
 Lombard Bank, Valletta, Malta 
 London Scottish Bank, Manchester, United Kingdom
 Luminor Bank, Tallinn, Estonia
 Luzerner Kantonalbank, Lucerne, Switzerland

M

 M&T Bank Corporation, Buffalo, United States
 M.M. Warburg & Co., Hamburg, Germany
 Macau Chinese Bank, Macau, Macao
 Mackinac Financial Corporation, Traverse City, United States
 Macquarie Group, Sydney, Australia
 Maduro & Curiel's Bank, Willemstad, Netherlands Antilles
 MagNet Bank, Budapest, Hungary 
 Makedonska banka, Skopje, Republic of Macedonia
 Malayan Banking Berhad, Kuala Lumpur, Malaysia
 Manas Bank, Kyrgyzstan 
 Manulife Bank of Canada, Waterloo, Canada
 Maple Bank, Frankfurt, Germany
 Mashreqbank, Dubai, United Arab Emirates
 MauBank, Ebene Cybercity, Mauritius
 Mauritius Commercial Bank, Port Louis, Mauritius
 Maybank, Kuala Lumpur, Malaysia
 mBank, Warsaw, Poland
 MBCA Bank, Harare, Zimbabwe
 MCB Bank, Lahore, Pakistan
 MCB Bank Limited, Lahore, Pakistan
 MCB Madagascar, Antananarivo, Madagascar
 MCB Islamic Bank Limited, Lahore, Pakistan
 MDM Bank, Novosibirsk, Russia
 ME Bank, Melbourne, Australia
 Mediobanca, Milano, Italy
 Mediocredito Italiano, Milan, Italy
 Mediterranean Bank, Valletta, Malta
 MeesPierson, Rotterdam, Netherlands
 Meem (bank), Manama, Bahrain
 Meezan Bank, Karachi, Pakistan
 MeDirect Bank Malta, Sliema, Malta
 Mega Bank Nepal Limited, Nepal, India
 Mega International Commercial Bank, Taipei, Taiwan
 Meghna Bank, Dhaka, Bangladesh
 Mekong Housing Bank, Ho Chi Minh City, Vietnam
 Melhus Sparebank, Melhus, Norway
 Mellat Bank, Yerevan, Armenia
 Mellat Investment Bank, Tehran, Iran
 ME Bank, Melbourne, Australia
 Mercantil Servicios Financieros, Caracas, Venezuela
 Mercantile Bank (Bangladesh), Dhaka, Bangladesh
 Mercantile Bank Limited, South Africa, Sandown, Gauteng, South Africa
 Mercantile Discount Bank, Tel Aviv, Israel
 Mercedes-Benz Bank, Stuttgart, Germany
 Merck Finck & Co, Munich, Germany
 Merkur Bank, Munich, Germany
 Metbank, Harare, Zimbabwe
 Metrocorp Bancshares, Houston, United States
 Metzler Bank, Frankfurt, Germany
 Mendelssohn & Co., Berlin, Germany
 MEVAS Bank, Hong Kong, China
 Michinoku Bank, Aomori, Japan
 Middle East Bank (Kenya), Nairobi, Kenya
 MidWestOne Financial Group, Iowa City, United States
 Migros Bank, Zurich, Switzerland
 Millennium BCP, Lisbon, Portugal
 Mir Business Bank, Moscow, Russia
 Mitsubishi UFJ Financial Group, Tokyo, Japan
 Mizuho Corporate Bank, Tokyo, Japan
 Mizuho Financial Group, Tokyo, Japan
 MKB Bank, Budapest, Hungary 
 MKB Unionbank, Sofia, Bulgaria
 Modhumoti Bank Limited, Bangladesh 
 Moldova Agroindbank, Chisinau, Moldova
 M Oriental Bank, Nairobi, Kenya
 Monetary Authority of Brunei Darussalam, Bandar Seri Begawan, Brunei
 Monet Investment Bank, Ulaanbaatar, Mongolia
 Montepio (bank), Lisbon, Portugal
 Moody Bancshares, Galveston, United States
 Mora Banc Grup, Andorra la Vella, Andorra
 Morgan Stanley, New York, United States
 MP Bank, Reykjavik, Iceland
 MPS Capital Services, Florence, Italy
 Münchner Bank, Munich, Germany
 Municipal Bank of Rosario, Rosario, Argentina
 MUFG Bank, Tokyo, Japan
 MUFG Union Bank, New York, United States
 Mutiara Bank, Jakarta, Indonesia
 Mutual Trust Bank Limited, Dhaka, Bangladesh
 Myanma Apex Bank, Nay Pyi Taw, Myanmar
 Myanma Economic Bank, Naypyidaw, Myanmar
 Myanma Foreign Trade Bank, Yangon, Myanmar
 Myanma Investment and Commercial Bank, Yangon, Myanmar
 MyState Limited, Hobart, Australia

N

 N M Rothschild & Sons, London, United Kingdom
 N26, Berlin, Germany
 Nabil Bank, Kathmandu, Nepal
 Nadra Bank, Kyiv, Ukraine
 Nainital Bank, Nainital, India
 Nanto Bank, Nara, Japan
 Nanyang Commercial Bank, Hong Kong, China
 Nathan Bostock, Maidstone, England
 National Agricultural Cooperative Federation, South Korea 
 National Australia Bank, Melbourne, Australia
 National Australia Bank (180 Queen Street), Queensland, Australia
 National Australia Bank (308 Queen Street), Queensland, Australia
 National Bank, Dhaka, Bangladesh
 National Bank, Essen, Germany
 National Bank Limited, Bengali, Bangladesh
 National Bank of Abu Dhabi, Abu Dhabi, United Arab Emirates
 National Bank of Angola, Luanda, Angola
 National Bank of Bahrain, Manama, Bahrain
 National Bank of Belize, Belmopan, Belize
 National Bank of Canada, Montreal, Canada
 National Bank of Commerce (Tanzania), Dar es Salaam, Tanzania
 National Bank of Dominica, Roseau, Dominica
 National Bank of Egypt, Cairo, Egypt
 National Bank of Fujairah, Fujairah, United Arab Emirates
 National Bank of Georgia, Tbilisi, Georgia
 National Bank of Greece, Athens, Greece
 National Bank of Greece, NBG Malta, Sliema, Malta
 National Bank of Kenya, Nairobi, Kenya
 National Bank of Kazakhstan, Almaty, Kazakhstan 
 National Bank of Kuwait, Safat, Kuwait
 National Bank of Liechtenstein, Vaduz, Liechtenstein
 National Bank of Malawi, Blantyre, Malawi
 National Bank of Moldova, Chisinau, Moldova
 National Bank of Oman, Ruwi, Oman
 National Bank of Pakistan, Karachi, Pakistan
 National Bank of Rwanda, Kigali, Rwanda
 National Bank of Samoa, Apia, Samoa
 National Bank of Slovakia, Bratislava, Slovakia
 National Bank of Sudan, Khartoum, Sudan
 National Bank of Tajikistan, Dushanbe, Tajikistan
 National Bank of the Republic of Belarus, Minsk, Belarus
 National Bank of the Kyrgyz Republic, Bishkek, Kyrgyz Republic
 National Bank of Ukraine, Kyiv, Ukraine
 National Bank of Uzbekistan, Tashkent, Uzbekistan
 National Bank of Vanuatu, Port Vila, Vanuatu
 National Bank of Yemen, Aden, Yemen
 National Commercial Bank, Al Bayda, Libya
 National Commercial Bank, Jeddah, Saudi Arabia
 National Development Bank, Colombo, Sri Lanka
 National Industrial Credit Bank, Nairobi, Kenya
 National Investment Bank, Accra, Ghana
 National Microfinance Bank, Dar es Salaam, Tanzania
 National Reserve Bank, Moscow, Russia
 National Savings Bank (Sri Lanka), Colombo, Sri Lanka
 National Westminster Bank, London, United Kingdom
 Nations Trust Bank, Colombo, Sri Lanka
 Nationwide Building Society, Northampton, United Kingdom
 Natixis, Paris, France
 NBD Bank, Nizhny Novgorod, Russia
 NBS Bank, Blantyre, Malawi
 NBT Bancorp, Norwich, United States
 NCC Bank, Dhaka, Bangladesh
 Nedbank Group, Johannesburg, South Africa
 Nederlandse Waterschapsbank, The Hague, Netherlands
 Nepal Bank, Kathmandu, Nepal
 Nepal Bangladesh Bank, Kathmandu, Nepal 
 Nepal Investment Bank, Kathmandu, Nepal
 Nepal Rastra Bank, Kathmandu, Nepal
 Nepal SBI Bank, Kathmandu, Nepal
 Netherlands Development Finance Company, The Hague, Netherlands
 New Bank of Santa Fe, Santa Fe Province, Argentina
 Newcastle Building Society, Newcastle upon Tyne, United Kingdom
 Newcastle Permanent Building Society, Newcastle, Australia
 New York Community Bancorp, Westbury, United States
 New Kabul Bank, Kabul, Afghanistan
 Nexi, Milan, Italy
 NIB Bank, Karachi, Pakistan
 NIBC Bank, The Hague, Netherlands
 NIC Bank Group, Nairobi, Kenya
 NIC Bank Tanzania, Dar es Salaam, Tanzania
 Nicolet Bankshares, Green Bay, United States
 Nile Commercial Bank, Juba, South Sudan
 NLB Group, Ljubljana, Slovenia
 NMB Bank Nepal, Kathmandu, Nepal
 Nomos Bank, Moscow, Russia
 Nomura Holdings, Tokyo, Japan
 Nonghyup Bank, Seoul, South Korea
 Noor Bank, Dubai, United Arab Emirates
 Norddeutsche Landesbank (NORD LB), Hanover, Germany
 Nordea Bank Finland, Helsinki, Finland
 Nordea Bank Norge, Oslo, Norway
 Nordea Bank Polska, Gdynia, Poland
 Nordlandsbanken (NB), Bodø, Norway
 Norges Bank, Oslo, Norway
 Norinchukin Bank, Tokyo, Japan
 Norisbank, Bonn, Germany
 Norne Securities, Oslo, Norway
 North Valley Bancorp, Redding, United States
 Northeast Bancorp, Lewiston, United States
 Northern Trust Corporation, Chicago, United States
 Norvik Banka, Riga, Latvia
 Norwich and Peterborough Building Society, Peterborough, United Kingdom
 Nottingham Building Society, Nottingham, United Kingdom
 Nova Ljubljanska Banka (NLB), Ljubljana, Slovenia
 Novikombank, Moscow, Russia
 Novo Banco, Lisbon, Portugal
 NRB Bank, Dhaka, Bangladesh
 NRW.BANK, Düsseldorf, Germany
 Nuevo Banco de Santa Fe, Santa Fe, Argentina
 Nurol Bank, Maslak, Turkey
 Nykredit, Copenhagen, Denmark

O

 Oberbank, Linz, Austria
 OCBC Wing Hang Bank, Hong Kong, China
 Ocean Bank, Hai Duong, Vietnam
 Ocean Bankshares, Miami, United States
 Oceanic Bank, Abuja, Nigeria
 ODDO BHF, Paris, France
 OFG Bancorp, San Juan, Puerto Rico
 Old National Bancorp, Evansville, United States
 Oldenburgische Landesbank, Oldenburg, Germany
 Oman Arab Bank, Ruwi, Oman
 Omni Bank (California), Alhambra, United States
 One Bank Limited, Dhaka, Bangladesh
 Openbank, Madrid, Spain
 OP Financial Group, Helsinki, Finland
 OP-Pohjola Group, Helsinki, Finland
 Orienbank, Dushanbe, Tajikistan
 Orient Bank, Kampala, Uganda
 Orient Bank, Ho Chi Minh City, Vietnam
 Oriental Bank of Commerce, New Delhi, India
 Oriental Commercial Bank, Nairobi, Kenya
 Oromia International Bank, Addis Ababa, Ethiopia
 Ostsächsische Sparkasse Dresden, Dresden, Germany
 Otkritie Financial Corporation, Moscow, Russia
 Otkritie FC Bank, Moscow, Russia
 OTP Bank, Budapest, Hungary
 Oversea Chinese Banking Corporation (OCBC), Singapore, Singapore

P

 Pacific & Western Bank of Canada, London, Canada
 Pacific Capital Bancorp, Santa Barbara, United States
 Pacific Global Bank, Chicago, United States
 Pacific Mercantile Bancorp, Costa Mesa, United States
 Pacific Premier Bancorp, Irvine, United States
 Pacwest Bancorp, San Diego, United States
 Padma Bank Limited, Dhaka, Bangladesh
 Pan Asia Banking Corporation PLC, Colombo, Sri Lanka
 Paramount Universal Bank, Nairobi, Kenya
 Parsian Bank, Tehran, Iran
 PASHA Bank Georgia, Tbilisi, Georgia
 Pashtany Bank, Kabul, Afghanistan
 Patria Bank, Bucharest, Romania
 Pax-Bank, Cologne, Germany
 Peoples, Colorado Springs, United States
 Peoples Bancorp of North Carolina, Newton, United States
 People's Bank (Sri Lanka), Colombo, Sri Lanka
 People's Bank of Zanzibar, Zanzibar, Tanzania
 People's Savings Bank (Celje), Celje, Slovenia
 Persia International Bank, London, United Kingdom
 Philippine Bank of Communications, Makati City, Philippines
 Philippine National Bank, Pasay, Philippines
 Philippine Veterans Bank, Makati City, Philippines
 Philtrust Bank, Manila, Philippines
 Phnom Penh Commercial Bank, Phnom Penh, Cambodia
 Ping An Bank, Shenzhen, China
 Pinnacle Financial Partners, Nashville, United States
 Piraeus Bank Group, Athens, Greece
 Piraeus Bank Romania, Bucharest, Romania
 PKO Bank Polski, Warsaw, Poland
 PlainsCapital Corporation, Dallas, United States
 P&N Bank, Perth, Australia
 PNB Banka, Riga, Latvia
 PNC Financial Services Group, Pittsburgh, United States
 Polaris Bank Limited, Lagos, Nigeria
 Police Bank, Sydney, Australia
 Popular, Inc., Hato Rey, San Juan, Puerto Rico
 Portuguese Commercial Bank, Porto, Portugal 
 Post Bank (Russia), Moscow, Russia
 Post Bank of Iran, Tehran, Iran
 Postal Savings Bank of China, Beijing, China
 Poste Italiane, Rome, Italy
 Poštová banka, Bratislava, Slovakia
 Prabhu Bank, Kathmandu, Nepal
 Pravex Bank, Kyiv, Ukraine
 Preferred Bank, Los Angeles, United States
 Premier Bank, Dhaka, Bangladesh
 President's Choice Bank, Toronto, Canada
 Prime Bank (Kenya), Nairobi, Kenya
 Prime Bank Limited, Dhaka, Bangladesh
 Prime Commercial Bank, Kathmandu, Nepal
 Primorska banka, Rijeka, Croatia
 Principality Building Society, Cardiff, United Kingdom
 PrivatBank, Riga, Latvia
 PrivatBank, Dnipropetrovsk, Ukraine
 Privatebancorp, Chicago, United States
 Privredna banka Zagreb, Zagreb, Croatia
 Probank, Athens, Greece
 Probashi Kallyan Bank, Dhaka, Bangladesh
 ProCredit Bank (Romania), Bucharest, Romania
 Prometey Bank, Yerevan, Armenia
 Prominvestbank, Kyiv, Ukraine
 Promsvyazbank, Moscow, Russia
 Prosperity Bancshares, Houston, United States
 Provident Financial Services, Jersey City, United States
 Prva banka Crne Gore, Podgorica, Montenegro
 PSD Bank, Bonn, Germany
 PSD Bank München, Augsburg, Germany
 Pubali Bank, Dhaka, Bangladesh
 Public Bank, Kuala Lumpur, Malaysia
 Public Bank (Hong Kong), Hong Kong, China
 Punjab & Sind Bank, New Delhi, India
 Punjab National Bank, New Delhi, India

Q

 Qarz Al-Hasaneh Mehr Iran Bank, Tehran, Iran
 Qatar Central Bank, Doha, Qatar
 Qatar Development Bank, Doha, Qatar
 Qatar Islamic Bank (QIB), Doha, Qatar
 Qatar National Bank, Doha, Qatar
 QCR Holdings, Moline, United States
 Qonto (neobank), Paris, France
 Qudos Bank, Sydney, Australia
 Quontic Bank, New York, United States
 Queensland National Bank, Brisbane, Australia

R

 Rabobank Group, Utrecht, Netherlands
 Rabobank New Zealand, Wellington, New Zealand
 Rafidain Bank, Baghdad, Iraq
 Raiffeisen (Albania), Albania
 Raiffeisenbank (Bulgaria), Sofia, Bulgaria
 Raiffeisenbank (Russia), Moscow, Russia
 Raiffeisen Bank Aval, Kyiv, Ukraine
 Raiffeisen Bank International, Vienna, Austria
 Raiffeisen Bank (Romania), Bucharest, Romania
 Raiffeisenlandesbank Niederösterreich-Wien, Vienna, Austria
 Raiffeisenlandesbank Oberösterreich, Linz, Austria
 Raiffeisen Landesbank Tirol, Innsbruck, Austria
 Raiffeisen Zentralbank, Vienna, Austria
 Rajshahi Krishi Unnayan Bank, Rajshahi, Bangladesh
 Rakbank, Ras Al-Khaimah, United Arab Emirates
 Rasheed Bank, Baghdad, Iraq
 Rastriya Banijya Bank, Kathmandu, Nepal
 Ratnakar Bank, Kolhapur, India
 Rawbank, Kinshasa, DRC Congo
 Raymond James Financial, St Petersburg, Florida, United States
 RBL Bank, Mumbai, India
 RCI Banque, Paris, France
 Real Bank, Kharkiv, Ukraine
 Real Estate Bank of Iraq, Baghdad, Iraq
 Refah Bank, Tehran, Iran
 Regional Australia Bank, Armidale, Australia
 Regions Financial Corp, Birmingham, United States
 Reisebank, Frankfurt, Germany
 Renaissance Credit, Moscow, Russia
 Renasant Corporation, Tupelo, United States
 Renta 4 Banco, Madrid, Spain
 Republic Bancorp, Louisville, United States
 Republic Bank, Port of Spain, Trinidad and Tobago
 Republic First Bancorp, Philadelphia, United States
 Reserve Bank of Australia, Sydney, Australia
 Reserve Bank of India, Mumbai, India
 Reserve Bank of Malawi, Malawi
 Reserve Bank of Zimbabwe, Harare, Zimbabwe 
 Resona Holdings, Osaka, Japan
 Reverta, Riga, Latvia
 RHB Bank Berhad, Kuala Lumpur, Malaysia
 Ridgewood Savings Bank, New York, United States
 Rietumu Banka, Riga, Latvia
 Riyad Bank, Riyadh, Saudi Arabia
 Rodovid Bank, Kyiv, Ukraine
 Rogers Bank, Toronto, Canada
 Rokel Commercial Bank, Freetown, Sierra Leone
 Rosbank, Moscow, Russia
 Rossiya Bank, Saint Petersburg, Russia
 Rossiysky Kredit Bank, Moscow, Russia
 Rothschild & Co, Paris, France
 Rothschild Martin Maurel, Marseille, France
 Royal Bank of Canada, Toronto, Canada
 Royal Bank of Scotland, Edinburgh, United Kingdom
 Royal Bank Zimbabwe, Harare, Zimbabwe
 Royal Business Bank, Los Angeles, United States
 Royal Monetary Authority of Bhutan, Thimphu, Bhutan
 Rupali Bank Limited, Dhaka, Bangladesh
 Russian Agricultural Bank, Moscow, Russia
 Russian National Commercial Bank, Moscow, Russia
 Russian Standard Bank, Moscow, Russia
 Russtroybank, Moscow, Russia
 Rwanda Development Bank, Kigali, Rwanda

S

 Safra National Bank of New York, New York, United States
 Sahara Bank, Tripoli, Liberia
 Sainsbury's Bank, London, United Kingdom
 Saitama Bank, [Urawa, Saitama|Urawa], Japan
 Salaam Somali Bank, Mogadishu, Somalia
 Sal. Oppenheim, Cologne, Germany
 Saman Bank, Tehran, Iran
 Samba Financial Group, Riyadh, Saudi Arabia
 Sampath Bank, Colombo, Sri Lanka
 Sanasa Development Bank, Kirulapone, Sri Lanka
 Sandnes Sparebank, Sandnes, Norway
 Santander Bank, Massachusetts, USA
 Santander Bank Polska, Wroclaw, Poland
 Santander Brasil, São Paulo, Brazil
 Santander Consumer Bank (Deutschland), Mönchengladbach, Germany
 Santander México, Mexico City, Mexico
 Santander UK, London, United Kingdom
 Saraswat Bank, Mumbai, India
 Sarmayeh Bank, Tehran, Iran
 Sasfin Bank, Waverley, South Africa
 Saudi British Bank, Riyadh, Saudi Arabia
 Sberkassa, Russia
 S-Bank, Helsinki, Finland
 Sberbank of Russia, Moscow, Russia
 Sberbank Europe Group, Vienna, Austria
 SBM Bank Kenya Limited, Nairobi, Kenya
 Schroders, London, United Kingdom
 Scotiabank, Toronto, Canada
 SEB Group, Stockholm, Sweden
 Security Bank Corporation, Makati City, Philippines
 Sekerbank, Istanbul, Turkey
 Seven Bank, Tokyo, Japan
 Seylan Bank, Colombo, Sri Lanka
 Shahjalal Islami Bank Limited, Dhaka, Bangladesh
 Shamil Bank of Yemen and Bahrain, Sana'a, Yemen
 Shamrao Vithal Co-operative Bank, Mumbai, India
 Shanghai Commercial Bank, Hong Kong, Hong Kong
 Shanghai Commercial and Savings Bank, Taipei, Taiwan
 Shanghai Pudong Development Bank, Shanghai, China
 Sharjah Islamic Bank, Sharjah, United Arab Emirates
 Shawbrook Bank, Manchester, United Kingdom
 Shengjing Bank, Shenyang, China
 Shimanto Bank, Dhaka, Bangladesh
 Shinhan Bank, Seoul, South Korea
 Shinhan Financial Group, Seoul, South Korea
 Shinsei Bank, Tokyo, Japan
 Shizuoka Bank, Shizuoka, Japan
 Shoko Chukin Bank, Tokyo, Japan
 Shonai Bank, Tsuruoka, Japan
 Siam Commercial Bank, Bangkok, Thailand
 Siddhartha Bank, Kathmandu, Nepal
 Sierra Leone Commercial Bank, Freetown, Sierra Leone
 Signature Bank, New York, United States
 Sidian Bank, Nairobi, Kenya
 Silkbank Limited, Karachi, Pakistan
 Sina Bank, Tehran, Iran
 Sindh Bank, Karachi, Pakistan
 Skipton Building Society, Skipton, United Kingdom
 Skue Sparebank, Nesbyen, Norway
 Skye Bank, Lagos, Nigeria
 Slovenská sporiteľňa, Bratislava, Slovakia
 Slovenska zarucna a rozvojova banka, Bratislava, Slovakia
 SNS Bank, Utrecht, Netherlands
 Social Islami Bank Limited, Dhaka, Bangladesh
 Société Générale, Paris, France
 Société Marseillaise de Crédit, Marseille, France
 Société Nationale de Crédit et d'Investissement, Luxembourg City, Luxembourg
 Societe Tunisienne de Banque, Tunis, Tunisia
 Sofitasa, San Cristobal, Venezuela
 Sogebank, Port-au-Prince, Haiti
 Sonali Bank, Dhaka, Bangladesh
 Soneri Bank, Lahore, Pakistan
 South African Reserve Bank, Pretoria, South Africa
 South Bangla Agriculture and Commerce Bank Limited, Dhaka, Bangladesh
 South Indian Bank, Thrissur, India
 Southeast Bank Limited, Dhaka, Bangladesh
 Southern Bank, Mount Olive, United States
 Southwestern National Bank, Houston, United States
 Sovereign Bancorp, Philadelphia, United States
 Spar Nord Bank, Aalborg, Denmark
 Sparda-Bank, Frankfurt, Germany
 SpareBank 1 BV, Sandefjord, Norway
 SpareBank 1 Nøtterøy–Tønsberg, Nøtterøy, Norway
 SpareBank 1 Østfold Akershus, Moss, Norway
 SpareBank 1 Ringerike Hadeland, Hønefoss, Norway
 SpareBank 1 SMN, Trondheim, Norway
 SpareBank 1 SR-Bank, Stavanger, Norway
 Sparebanken Hedmark, Hamar, Norway
 Sparebanken More, Aalesund, Norway
 Sparebanken Nord-Norge, Tromsø, Norway
 Sparebanken Nordvest, Kristiansund, Norway
 Sparebanken Sør, Kristiansand, Norway
 Sparebanken Sogn og Fjordane, Sogn og Fjordane, Norway
 Sparebanken Vest, Bergen, Norway
 Sparkasse Hagen, Hagen, Germany
 Sparkasse Leipzig, Leipzig, Germany
 Sparkasse Mittelholstein, Rendsburg, Germany
 Sparkasse zu Lübeck, Lübeck, Germany
 Spire Bank, Nairobi, Kenya
 Spitamen Bank, Dushanbe, Tajikistan
 St.George Bank, Sydney, Australia
 Stadtsparkasse München, München, Germany
 Stanbic Bank, Johannesburg, South Africa
 Stanbic Bank Uganda Limited, Kampala, Uganda
 Stanbic Holdings plc, Nairobi, Kenya
 Stanbic IBTC Holdings, Lagos, Nigeria
 Standard Bank Group (Stanbank), Johannesburg, South Africa
 Standard Bank Limited, Dhaka, Bangladesh
 Standard Bank Malawi, Lilongwe, Malawi
 Standard Bank Namibia, Windhoek, Namibia
 Standard Chartered, London, United Kingdom
 Standard Chartered Bangladesh, Dhaka, Bangladesh
 Standard Chartered Bank Ghana, Accra, Ghana
 Standard Chartered Bank Hong Kong, Hong Kong, Hong Kong
 Standard Chartered Kenya, Nairobi, Kenya
 Standard Chartered Korea, Seoul, South Korea
 Standard Chartered Nepal, New Baneshwor, Kathmandu, Nepal
 Standard Chartered Pakistan, Karachi, Pakistan
 Standard Chartered Uganda, Kampala, Uganda
 Standard Chartered Zambia, Lusaka, Zambia
 Standard Chartered Zimbabwe, Harare, Zimbabwe
 State Bank of Bikaner and Jaipur, Jaipur, India
 State Bank of Hyderabad, Hyderabad, India
 State Bank of India, Mumbai, India
 State Bank of Mauritius, Port Louis, Mauritius
 State Bank of Mysore, Bangalore, India
 State Bank of Patiala, Patiala, India
 State Bank of Travancore, Thiruvananthapuram, India
 State Export-Import Bank of Ukraine, Kyiv, Ukraine
 State Savings Bank of Ukraine, Kyiv, Ukraine
 State Street Corp, Boston, United States
 Sterling Bancorp, New York, United States
 Sterling Financial Corporation, Spokane, United States
 Steyler Bank, Sant Augustin, Germany
 Stifel Financial Corp, St Louis, United States
 Südwestbank,  Stuttgart, Germany
 Stusid Bank, Tunis, Tunisia
 Stuttgarter Volksbank, Stuttgart, Germany
 Sudtiroler Volksbank, Bolzano, Italy
 Sumitomo Mitsui Banking Corporation, Tokyo, Japan
 Sumitomo Mitsui Financial Group, Tokyo, Japan
 Sumitomo Mitsui Trust Bank, Tokyo, Japan
 Summit Bancorp, Arkadelphia, Arkansas, United States
 Summit Bank, Karachi, Pakistan
 Suncorp Bank, Brisbane, Australia
 Suncorp Metway, Brisbane, Australia
 Sunny Bank, Taipei, Taiwan
 Sunrise Bank, Kathmandu, Nepal
 SunTrust Banks, Atlanta, United States
 Suomen AsuntoHypoPankki, Helsinki, Finland
 Susquehanna Bancshares, Lititz, United States
 Svenska Handelsbanken, Stockholm, Sweden
 Swedbank, Stockholm, Sweden
 Sydbank, Aabenraa, Denmark
 Syndicate Bank, Manipal, India
 Synovus Financial Corp, Columbus, United States
 Syria International Islamic Bank, Damascus, Syria

T

 T Bank, Athens, Greece
 Tadhamon International Islamic Bank, Sana'a, Yemen
 Taichung Commercial Bank, Taichung, Taiwan
 Taipei Fubon Bank, Taiwan 
 Taishin International Bank, Taipei, Taiwan
 Taiwan Cooperative Bank, Taipei, Taiwan
 Taiwan Financial Holdings Group, Taipei, Taiwan
 Takarékbank, Budapest, Hungary
 Talmer Bancorp, Troy, United States
 Tamilnad Mercantile Bank, Tuticorin, India
 Tangerine Bank, Toronto, Canada
 Tanzania Investment Bank, Dar es Salaam, Tanzania
 Tapiola Bank, Espoo, Finland
 Targobank, Düsseldorf, Germany
 Tatra banka, Bratislava, Slovakia
 Taunus Corporation, New York, United States
 TBC Bank, Tbilisi, Georgia
 TBI Bank, Sofia, Bulgaria
 TCF Financial Corporation, Detroit, United States
 Teachers Mutual Bank, Homebush, Australia
 Tejarat Bank, Tehran, Iran
 Tesco Bank, Edinburgh, United Kingdom
 Texas Capital Bancshares, Dallas, United States
 Texim Bank, Sofia, Bulgaria
 The 77 Bank, Tohoku, Japan
 Thanachart Bank, Bangkok, Thailand
 The Bank of East Asia, Hong Kong, Hong Kong
 The BANK of Greenland, Nuuk, Greenland
 The City Bank, Dhaka, Bangladesh
 The Commercial Bank of Qatar, Doha, Qatar
 The Farmers Bank Limited, Dhaka, Bangladesh
 The Hongkong and Shanghai Banking Corporation, Hong Kong, Hong Kong
 The National Bank TNB, Palestine 
 The Senshu Bank, Japan 
 Theodoor Gilissen Bankiers, Amsterdam, Netherlands
 Thüringer Aufbaubank, Thüringen, Germany
 TIAA Bank, Florida, United States
 TIB Development Bank, Dar es Salaam, Tanzania
 Time Bank Zimbabwe, Harare, Zimbabwe
 Tinkoff Bank, Moscow, Russia
 Tinkoff Credit Systems, Moscow, Russia
 Tirana Bank, Tirana, Albania
 TMB Bank, Bangkok, Thailand
 Toho Bank, Fukushima, Japan
 Tohoku Bank, Morioka, Japan
 Tokyo Star Bank, Tokyo, Japan
 Tomato Bank, Okayama, Japan
 Tompkins Financial Corporation, Ithaca, United States
 Toronto Dominion Bank (TD Bank), Toronto, Canada
 Tourism Development Bank, Kathmandu, Nepal
 Trade and Development Bank, Ulaanbataar, Mongolia
 Trade Bank of Iraq, Baghdad, Iraq
 Transcapitalbank, Moscow, Russia
 Transnational Bank, Nairobi, Kenya
 Triodos Bank, Zeist, Netherlands
 Tropical Bank, Kampala, Uganda
 Truist Financial, Charlotte, United States
 Trust Bank Limited (Bangladesh), Dhaka, Bangladesh
 Trust Merchant Bank (TMB), Kinshasa, DRC Congo
 Trustco Bank Namibia, Ongwediva, Namibia
 TSB Bank (United Kingdom), Edingburgh, United Kingdom
 Turk Ekonomi Bankasi (TEB), Istanbul, Turkey
 Turkish Bank, Istanbul, Turkey
 Turkiye Is Bankasi, Istanbul, Turkey
 Türk Ekonomi Bankası, Istanbul, Turkey
 Türk Ticaret Bankası, Istanbul, Turkey
 Türkiye İş Bankası, Levent, Istanbul, Turkey
 Tyro Payments, Sydney, Australia

U

 UBank, Sydney, Australia
 UBI Banca, Bergamo, Italy
 UBS, Zurich, Switzerland
 UCO Bank, Calcutta, India
 Uganda Development Bank Limited, Kampala, Uganda
 Ukrainian Credit-Banking Union, Kyiv, Ukraine
 UkrSibbank, Kyiv, Ukraine
 Ukrsotsbank, Kyiv, Ukraine
 Ulster Bank Ireland, Dublin, Ireland
 Umpqua Holdings Corporation, Portland, United States
 Umweltbank, Nürnberg, Germany
 Unibank, Baku, Azerbaijan
 Unibank, Port-au-Prince, Haiti
 Unibank Ghana, Accra, Ghana
 Unibank (Azerbaijan), Baku, Azerbaijan
 Unicaja, Malaga, Spain
 UniCredit, Milan, Italy
 UniCredit Bank Czech Republic and Slovakia, Prague, Czech Republic
 UniCredit Bank Romania, Bucharest, Romania
 UniCredit Bank Russia, Moscow, Russia
 UniCredit Bank Serbia, Belgrade, Serbia
 UniCredit Bank Slovenia, Ljubljana, Slovenia
 UniCredit Bulbank, Sofia, Bulgaria
 UniCredit Tiriac Bank, Bucharest, Romania
 Union Bancaire Privée, Geneva, Switzerland
 Union Bank (Albania), Tirana, Albania
 Union Bank of Colombo, Colombo, Sri Lanka
 Union Bank of India, Mumbai, India
 Union Bank of Israel, Tel Aviv, Israel
 Union Bank of Nigeria, Lagos, Nigeria
 Union Bank of Taiwan, Taipei, Taiwan
 Union Bank UK, London, United Kingdom
 Union National Bank, Abu Dhabi, United Arab Emirates
 Union Trust Bank, Freetown, Sierra Leone
 Unione di Banche Italiane, Bergamo, Italy
 Unione Fiduciaria, Milan, Italy
 Unipol Banca, Bologna, Italy
 Unistream, Russia 
 United Amara Bank, Yangon, Myanmar
 United Bank for Africa, Lagos, Nigeria
 United Bank for Africa (Uganda), Nigeria
 United Bank of Albania, Tirana, Albania
 United Bank of India, Calcutta, India
 United Bank Limited (Pakistan), Karachi, Pakistan
 United Bankshares, Charleston, United States
 United Bulgarian Bank, Sofia, Bulgaria
 United Coconut Planters Bank (UCPB), Makati City, Philippines
 United Commercial Bank, Dhaka, Bangladesh
 United Commercial Bank Ltd, Dhaka, Bangladesh
 United Community Banks, Blairsville, United States
 United Gulf Bank, Manama, Bahrain
 United International Bank, New York, United States
 United Orient Bank, New York, United States
 United Overseas Bank, Singapore, Singapore
 United Security Bancshares, Thomasville, United States
 Unity Bank, Abuja, Nigeria
 Unity Trust Bank, Birmingham, United Kingdom
 Urner Kantonalbank, Altdorf, Switzerland
 Uralsib, Moscow, Russia
 Urban Partnership Bank, Chicago, United States
 Urwego Opportunity Bank, Kigali, Rwanda
 US Bancorp, Minneapolis, United States
 UT Bank, Accra, Ghana
 Uttara Bank, Dhaka, Bangladesh

V

 VakıfBank, Levent, Istanbul, Turkey
 Valley National Bancorp, Wayne, United States
 Vancouver City Savings Credit Union, Vancouver, Canada
 Van Lanschot Kempen, 's-Hertogenbosch, Netherlands
 Varengold Bank, Hamburg, Germany
 Vattanac Bank, Phnom Penh, Cambodia
 VBS Mutual Bank, Louis Trichardt, South Africa
 VBU Volksbank im Unterland eG, Schwaigern, Germany
 VDK Spaarbank, Belgium
 VEB.RF, Moscow, Russia
 VEM Aktienbank, Munich, Germany
 Veneto Banca, Montebelluna, Italy
 Victoria Commercial Bank, Nairobi, Kenya
 Vietnam Bank for Agriculture and Rural Development, Hanoi, Vietnam
 Vijaya Bank, Bangalore, India
 Viking Bank, Saint Petersburg, Russia
 Virginia Commerce Bancorp, Arlington, United States
 Vnesheconombank, Moscow, Russia
 Volksbank Bielefeld-Gütersloh, Gütersloh, Germany
 Volksbank Neckartal, Eberbach, Germany
 Volt Bank, Sydney, Australia
 Voss Veksel- og Landmandsbank, Voss, Norway
 Vostochny Bank, Blagoveshchensk, Russia
 Vozrozhdenie Bank, Moscow, Russia
 VP Bank AG, Vaduz, Liechtenstein
 Všeobecná úverová banka, Bratislava, Slovakia
 VTB Bank, St Petersburg, Russia
 VTB Bank Deutschland, Frankfurt am Main, Germany

W

 Walser Privatbank, Hirschegg, Austria
 Warka Bank, Baghdad, Iraq
 Washington Federal, Seattle, United States
 WeBank (Italy), Milan, Italy
 Webster Financial Corp, Waterbury, United States
 Wegagen Bank, Addis Ababa, Ethiopia
 Wells Fargo & Co, San Francisco, United States
 West Bromwich Building Society, West Bromwich, United Kingdom
 Westamerica Bancorp, San Rafael, United States
 Westpac, Sydney, Australia
 WGZ Bank, Düsseldorf, Germany
 Wing Hang Bank, Hong Kong, Hong Kong
 Wing Lung Bank, Hong Kong, Hong Kong
 Wintrust Financial Corp, Lake Forest, United States
 Wirecard, Munich, Germany
 Woodforest Financial Group, The Woodlands, United States
 Woori Bank, Seoul, South Korea
 Woori Financial Group, Seoul, South Korea
 Workers United, New York, United States
 Wüstenrot Bank, Ludwigsburg, Germany
 Wüstenrot & Württembergische, Stuttgart, Germany

X

 XacBank, Ulaanbataar, Mongolia
 Xiamen International Bank, Xiamen, China
 Xinja, Sydney, Australia

Y

 yA Bank, Oslo, Norway
 Yamagata Bank, Tokyo, Japan
 Yamaguchi Bank, Shimonoseki, Japan
 Yapi Kredi Bank Azerbaijan, Baku, Azerbaijan
 Yapı ve Kredi Bankası, Istanbul, Turkey
 Yemen Commercial Bank, Sana'a, Yemen
 Yes Bank, Mumbai, India
 Yoma Bank, Yangon, Myanmar
 Yorkshire Building Society, Bradford, United Kingdom

Z

 Zag Bank, High River Canada
 Zagrebacka Banka, Zagreb, Croatia
 Zamanbank, Kazakhstan 
 Zambia National Commercial Bank, Lusaka, Zambia
 Zarai Taraqiati Bank Limited, Islamabad, Pakistan
 ZAO Raiffeisenbank, Moscow, Russia
 Zenith Bank, Lagos, Nigeria
 Zhejiang Chouzhou Commercial Bank, Yiwu, China
 Zhejiang Tailong Commercial Bank, Taizhou, China
 Zions Bancorporation, Salt Lake City, United States
 Ziraat Bankası, Ulus, Ankara, Turkey
 Ziraat Katılım, Turkey 
 Zuger Kantonalbank, Zug, Switzerland
 Zurich Cantonal Bank, Zurich, Switzerland

See also
List of banks in Africa
List of banks in the Americas
List of banks in Asia
List of banks in Europe

References

External links

Lists of banks